= Islamic Society of Finland =

Islamic community in Helsinki, Finland

- Finnish: Suomen Islamilanien Yhdyskunta

Religion
- Affiliation: Islam
- Branch/tradition: Sunni

Location
- Municipality: Helsinki
- Country: Finland
- Interactive map of Islamic Society of Finland
- Coordinates: 60.164500°N 24.934376°E

Architecture
- Type: Mosque
- Established: 1987

Website
- rabita.fi

The Islamic Society of Finland (Finnish: Suomen Islamilanien Yhdyskunta) is an Islamic community registered in Finland, founded in 1986, and registered in 1987, making it the second oldest Islamic congregation in Finland. It is located in downtown Helsinki, where it has a mosque. The society is a member of the Federation of Islamic Organizations in Europe (FIOE). It has a Qur'an school for children, and provides educational services about Arabic and Islamic studies for people of all ages. It also has grown in size quickly over the years, having 1,796 members in 2019, and 4,344 reported in 2023. The societies building provides a wide array of facilities, including marriage services, fatwa advice, halal certificates, guidance and arrangement for both Hajj and Umrah, and Islamic funeral procedures.

In 2025 the center was awarded €31,178 by the Ministry of Education and Culture of Finland in their general grant for assisting the activities of registered religious communities.

== Notable imams ==
In 2010, Anas Hajjar was chosen as the new imam. He suggested a reinforcement of education and organization of imam education among universities and in the home. In 2012, the Helsinki Times reported on his opinions about zoning changes making the construction of mosques nearly impossible, and that Finland only has one purpose-built mosque in Järvenpää, Finland because of these problems. Hajjar died on December 7, 2022.

== See also ==
- Islam in Finland
- Helsinki Islamic Center
- Järvenpää Mosque
- Finnish-Islamic Congregation
