= Penance =

Repentance of sins

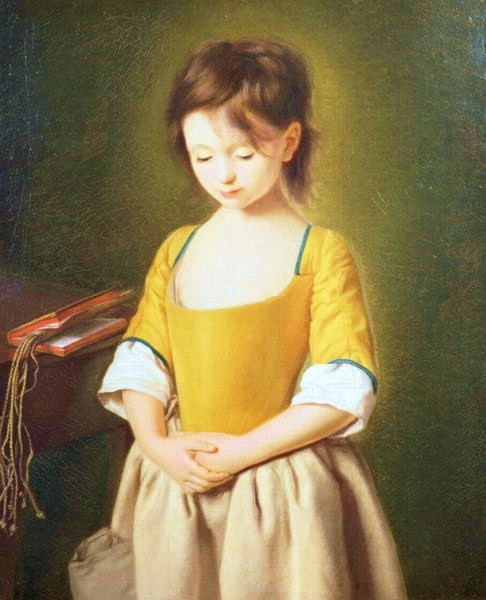
La Penitente by Pietro Rotari

Penance is any act or a set of actions done out of contrition for sins committed, as well as an alternative name for the Catholic, Eastern Orthodox, and Oriental Orthodox sacrament of Reconciliation or Confession.

The word penance derives from Old French and Latin paenitentia, both of which derive from the same root meaning repentance, a sincere change of heart and feeling of remorse (contrition). Penance and repentance, similar in their derivation and original sense, have come to represent conflicting views of the essence of repentance, arising from the controversy in the Protestant Reformation as to the respective merits of "faith" and "good works".

According to dictionary definitions, the primary meaning of penance is the deeds done out of penitence. Like the latter, repentance refers to the genuine interior sorrow for one's hurtful words or actions. Only repentance implies a purpose of amendment, the resolve to avoid such hurtful behavior in the future. The words "true" and "firm" might be added to all but penance, to specify the depth of change in one's hurtful attitude. Contrition is the state of feeling remorseful, and can describe both the show of deepest regret and the firmest sorrow for one's wrongdoings.

== Christianity ==
=== Penance as a religious attitude ===
A 17th-century depiction of one of the 28 articles of the Augsburg Confession by Wenceslas Hollar, which divides repentance into two parts: "One is contrition, that is, terrors smiting the conscience through the knowledge of sin; the other is faith, which is born of the Gospel, or of absolution, and believes that for Christ's sake, sins are forgiven, comforts the conscience, and delivers it from terrors."

Protestant Reformers, upholding the doctrine of justification by faith alone, held that repentance consisted in a change of the whole moral attitude of the mind and soul (Matthew 13:15; Luke 22:32), and that the divine forgiveness preceded true repentance and confession to God without any reparation of "works". In his Of Justification By Faith, Calvin says: "without forgiveness no man is pleasing to God." Nonetheless, in traditions formed by a Calvinist or Zwinglian sensibility, there has traditionally been a stress on reconciliation as a precondition to fellowship.

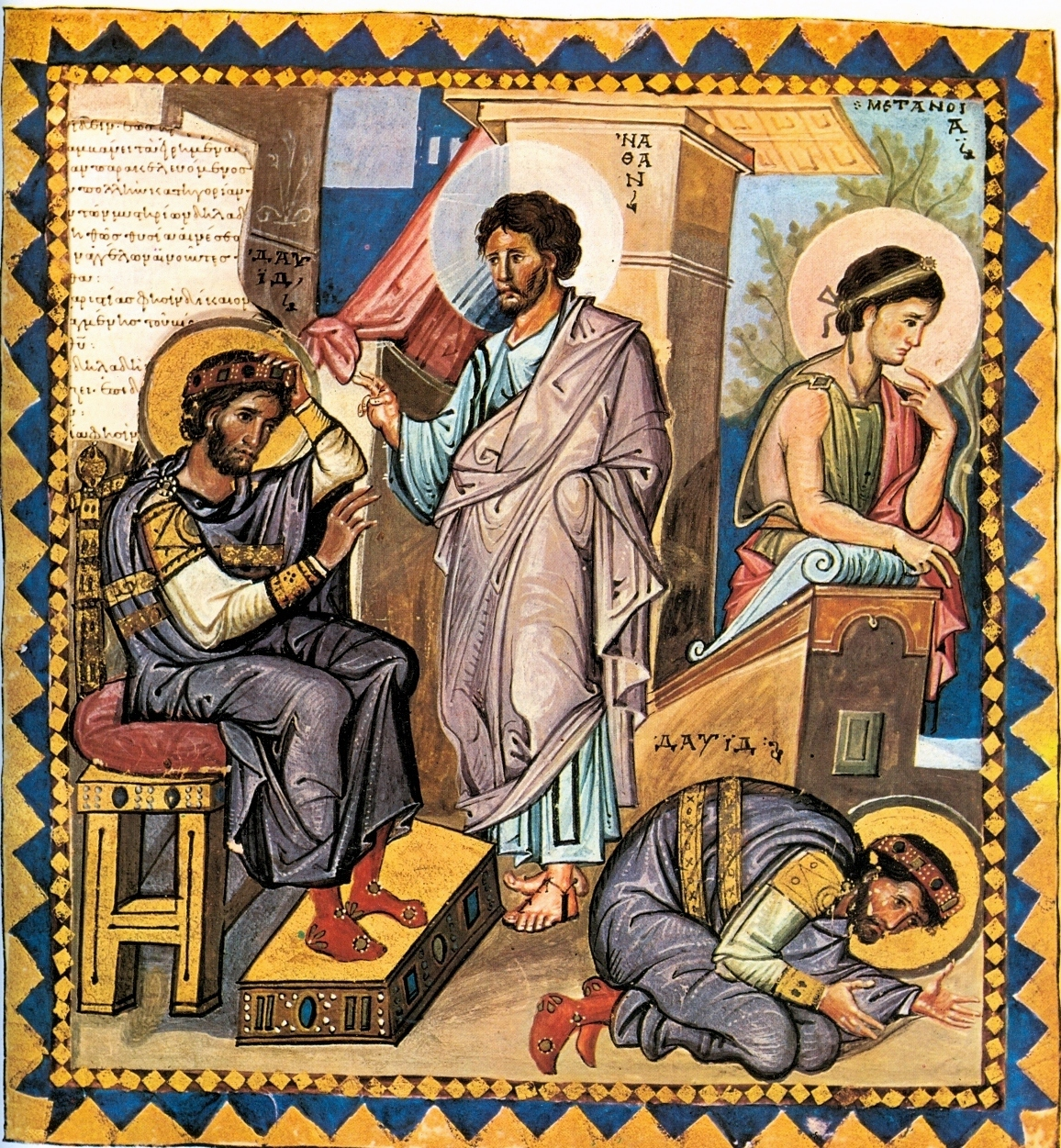
The reproach of Nathan and the penance of King David (Paris Psalter, folio 136v, 10th century).

Typically in the non-Protestant view, the attitude of penance or repentance can also be externalized in acts that a believer imposes on themselves, acts that are called penances. Penitential activity is particularly common during the season of Lent and Holy Week. Advent is another season during which, to a lesser extent, penances are performed. Acts of self-discipline are used as tokens of repentance. Easier acts of self-discipline include devoting time to prayer or reading of the Bible or other spiritual books. Examples of harder acts of self-discipline are fasting, sexual continence, abstaining from alcohol or tobacco, or other privations: self-flagellation and the wearing of a cilice are rarely encountered in modern times. Such acts have sometimes been called mortification of the flesh, a phrase inspired by Romans 8:13: "If you live according to the flesh you will die, but if by the Spirit you put to death the deeds of the body, you will live."

In some cultural traditions, Holy Week, which commemorates the Passion of Christ, may be marked by penances that include flagellantism or even voluntary pseudo-crucifixion which has been denounced by Filipino Catholics bishops as possible "spiritual vanity."

The New Testament does not codify a ritual for repentance and reconciliation: baptism was practised and confession of sins to one another for the sake of healing is mentioned in the Epistle of James. With the delay of the expected Second Coming, there was a recognized need for a means of accepting back into the Christian community those who had been expelled for serious sins: in early Christianity, bishops declared that God had forgiven sins when it was clear that there was repentance, and the penitent was readmitted to the community. Today the act of penance or satisfaction imposed in connection with the sacrament for the same therapeutic purpose can consist of set prayers or a certain number of prostrations or an act or omission intended to reinforce what is positive in the penitent's behaviour or to inhibit what is negative. The act imposed is itself called a penance or epitemia.

=== Penance as a sacrament or rite ===
==== Catholicism ====
The Catholic Church uses the term "penance" in a number of separate but related instances: (a) as a moral virtue, (b) as a sacrament, (c) as acts of satisfaction, and (d) as those specific acts of satisfaction assigned the penitent by the confessor in the context of the sacrament. These have as in common the concept that the person who sins must repent and as far as possible make reparation to divine justice.

===== A moral virtue =====
Penance is a moral virtue whereby the sinner is disposed to hatred of their sin as an offence against God and to a firm purpose of amendment and satisfaction. The principal act in the exercise of this virtue is the detestation of one's own sins.

Penance, while a duty, is considered to be a gift in Catholicism, as it is held that no person can do any penance worthy of God's consideration without God first giving the grace to do so. Penance proclaims mankind's unworthiness in the face of God's condescension, the indispensable disposition to God's grace, for though sanctifying grace alone forgives and purges sins from the soul, it is necessary that the individual consent to this action of grace by the work of the virtue of penance. Penance helps to conquer sinful habits and builds generosity, humility and patience.

The motive of this detestation is that sins offend God. Theologians, following Thomas Aquinas (Summa III, Q. lxxxv, a. 1), regard penance as truly a virtue, though they have disagreed regarding its place among the virtues. Some have classed it with the virtue of charity, others with the virtue of religion, Bonaventure saw it as a part of the virtue of justice. Cajetan seems to have considered it as belonging to all three; however, most theologians agree with Aquinas that penance is a distinct virtue (virtus specialis).

Penance as a virtue resides in the will. Since it is a part of the cardinal virtue of justice, it can operate in a soul which has lost the virtue of charity by mortal sin. However it cannot exist in a soul which has lost the virtue of faith, since without faith all sense of the just measure of the injustice of sin is lost. It urges the individual to undergo punishment for the sake of repairing the order of justice; when motivated by even an ordinary measure of supernatural charity it infallibly obtains the forgiveness of venial sins and their temporal punishments; when motivated by that extraordinary measure which is called perfect charity (love of God for his own sake) it obtains the forgiveness of even mortal sins, when it desires simultaneously to seek out the Sacrament of penance as soon as possible, and of large quantities of temporal punishment.

===== Sacrament of Penance =====
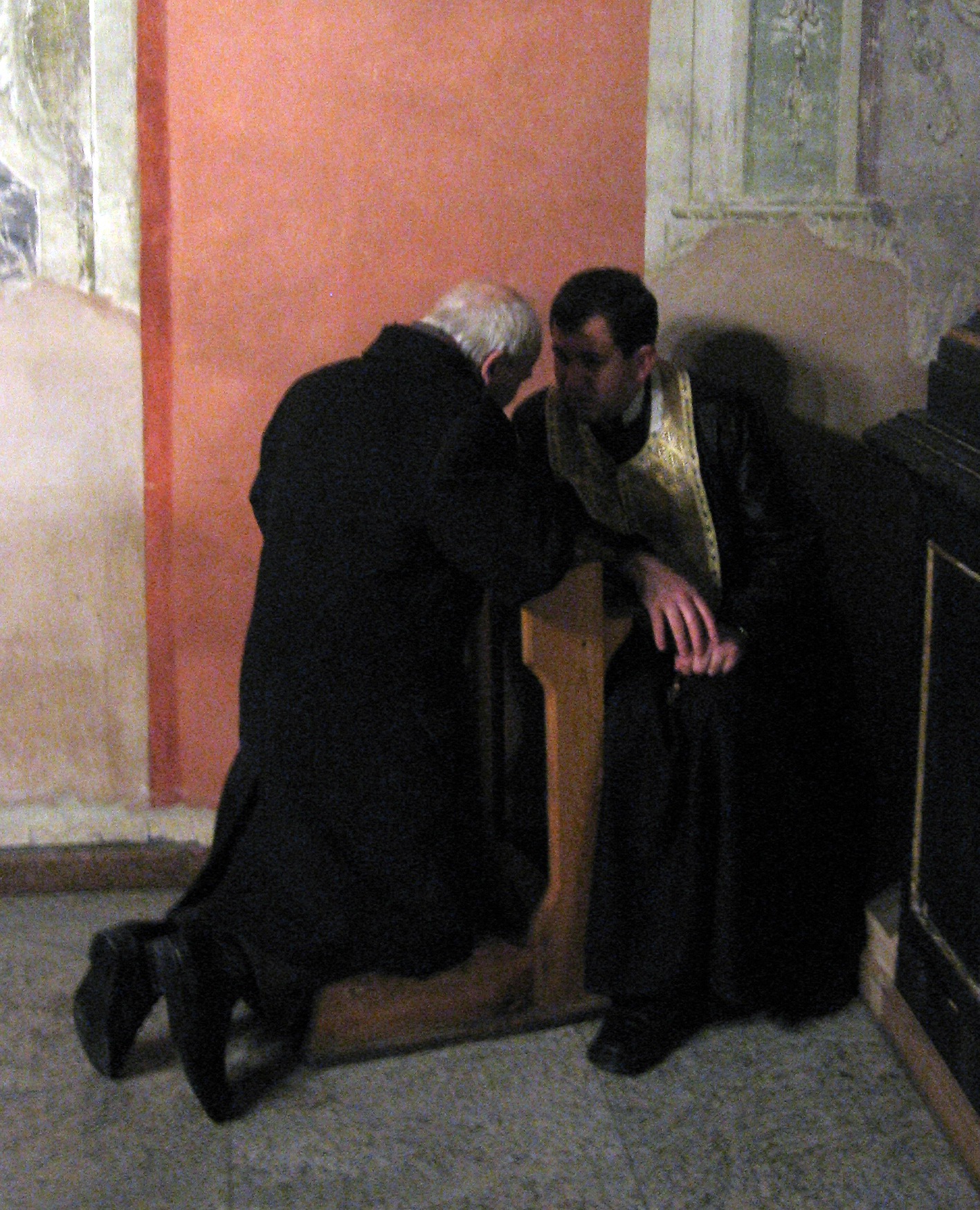
Confession in a Ukrainian Greek Catholic Church, 2007

In Catholic teaching, confession of sins is made to God and absolution is received from God: the priest who is the minister of the sacrament acts not in his own name but on behalf of God. In this sacrament, the sinner places themselves before the merciful judgment of God; this anticipates in a certain way, the merciful judgment to which they will be subjected at the end of their earthly life.

According to the Catholic Catechism, "the process of repentance and conversion was described by Jesus in the parable of prodigal son." In the Catholic Church, the sacrament of penance (also called reconciliation, forgiveness, confession and conversion) is one of the two sacraments of healing: Jesus Christ has willed that by this means the church should continue, in the power of the Holy Spirit, his work of healing and salvation. Reconciliation with God is both the purpose and effect of this sacrament.

Essential to the sacrament are acts both by the sinner (examination of conscience, contrition with a determination not to sin again, confession to a priest, and performance of some act to repair the damage caused by sin) and by the priest (determination of the act of reparation to be performed and absolution). among the penitent's acts contrition holds first place. Serious sins (mortal sins) must be confessed within at most a year and always before receiving Holy Communion, while confession of venial sins also is recommended.

In locations or situations where priests are not available, people will make their own act of contrition direct to God in anticipation of the sacrament (Note: During the COVID 19 pandemic, Pope Francis taught "Do what the Catechism (of the Catholic Church) says. It is very clear: If you cannot find a priest to confess to, speak directly with God, your father, and tell him the truth. Say, 'Lord, I did this, this, this. Forgive me,' and ask for pardon with all your heart." Make an act of contrition, the pope said, and promise God, "'I will go to confession afterward, but forgive me now.' And immediately you will return to a state of grace with God.") and deathbed confessions may if necessary be prayed with any suitable religious or layperson. (Note: Ralph of Shrewsbury, the Bishop of Bath and Wells, stated in 1349 that “we understand that [because of the Black Death ] many people are dying without the sacrament of penance,” advising that “if when on the point of death they cannot secure the services of a properly ordained priest, they should make confession of their sins…to any lay person, even to a woman if a man is not available.” Rosemary Horrox, The Black Death (Manchester, 1994), 271-3.)

===== Assigned penance =====
The act of penance or satisfaction that the priest imposes helps the penitent to overcome selfishness, to desire more strongly to live a holy life, to be closer to Jesus, and to show others the love and compassion of Jesus. It is part of the healing that the sacrament brings: "Sin injures and weakens the sinner himself, as well as his relations with God and neighbour. Absolution takes away sin, but it does not remedy all the disorders sin has caused. Raised up from sin, the sinner must still recover his full spiritual health by doing something more to make amends for the sin: he must 'make satisfaction for' or 'expiate' his sins." This is done by prayer, charity, or an act of Christian asceticism. The rite of the sacrament requires that "the kind and extent of the satisfaction should be suited to the personal condition of each penitent so that each one may restore the order which he disturbed and through the corresponding remedy be cured of the sickness from which he suffered."

Penance may consist of prayer, works of mercy, service of neighbor, voluntary self-denial, sacrifices, "and above all the patient acceptance of the cross we all must bear. Such penances help configure us to Christ, who alone expiated our sins once for all."

===== Penitential acts =====
In the 1966 apostolic constitution Paenitemini Pope Paul VI said, "Penance therefore—already in the Old Testament—is a religious, personal act which has as its aim love and surrender to God: fasting for the sake of God, not for one's own self... [The Church] reaffirms the primacy of the religious and supernatural values of penitence (values extremely suitable for restoring to the world today a sense of the presence of God and of His sovereignty over man and a sense of Christ and His salvation)." In Paenitemini it is affirmed that "[b]y divine law all the faithful are required to do penance." "As from the fact of sin we Christians can claim no exception, so from the obligation to penance we can seek no exemption." Chapter 8 of the Didache enjoined Christians to fast every Wednesday and Friday.

The conversion of heart can be expressed in many ways. "Scripture and the Fathers insist above all on three forms, fasting, prayer, and almsgiving, which express conversion in relation to oneself, to God, and to others." Also mentioned are efforts at reconciliation with one's neighbor, and the practice of charity "which covers a multitude of sins" as in 1 Peter 4:8. "Taking up one's cross each day and following Jesus is the surest way of penance."

In the Liturgical year, the seasons of Advent and Lent are particularly appropriate for penitential exercises such as voluntary self-denial and fraternal sharing. Under canon 1250 of the 1983 Code of Canon Law, "The penitential days and times in the universal Church are every Friday of the whole year and the season of Lent." Canon 1253 states that "The conference of bishops can determine more precisely the observance of fast and abstinence as well as substitute other forms of penance, especially works of charity and exercises of piety, in whole or in part, for abstinence and fast."

In 2001 the United States Conference of Catholic Bishops, in a document titled "Penitential Practices for Today's Catholics", reiterated their decision to allow U.S. Catholics to substitute another form of penance for abstinence from meat on the Fridays outside of Lent. While the document includes a list of suggested penitential practices, the selection of a Friday penance is left to the individual.

In 2011, Catholic bishops in England and Wales reversed their earlier decision to permit Catholics to practice a penance other than meat abstinence on Fridays. They said, in part: "The bishops wish to re-establish the practice of Friday penance in the lives of the faithful as a clear and distinctive mark of their own Catholic identity. [...] It is important that all the faithful be united in a common celebration of Friday penance."

It is held that if fasting honestly causes one to be unable to fulfill their required tasks, it is uncharitable to fast, and the law of fasting would not apply.

Many acts of penance carry an indulgence, which may be applied in behalf of the souls departed. God alone knows what remains to be expiated. The Church, in granting an indulgence to the living, exercises its jurisdiction; over the dead it has no jurisdiction and therefore makes the indulgence available for them by way of suffrage (per modum suffragii), i.e. it petitions God to accept these works of satisfaction and in consideration thereof to mitigate or shorten the sufferings of the souls in Purgatory.

===== Salutary penance =====
According to the Church’s Code of Canon Law:

The confessor is to enjoin salutary and suitable penances in keeping with the quality and number of the sins, but with attention to the condition of the penitent; the penitent is obliged to perform the penances personally (Canon 98).

==== Eastern Orthodox Church ====
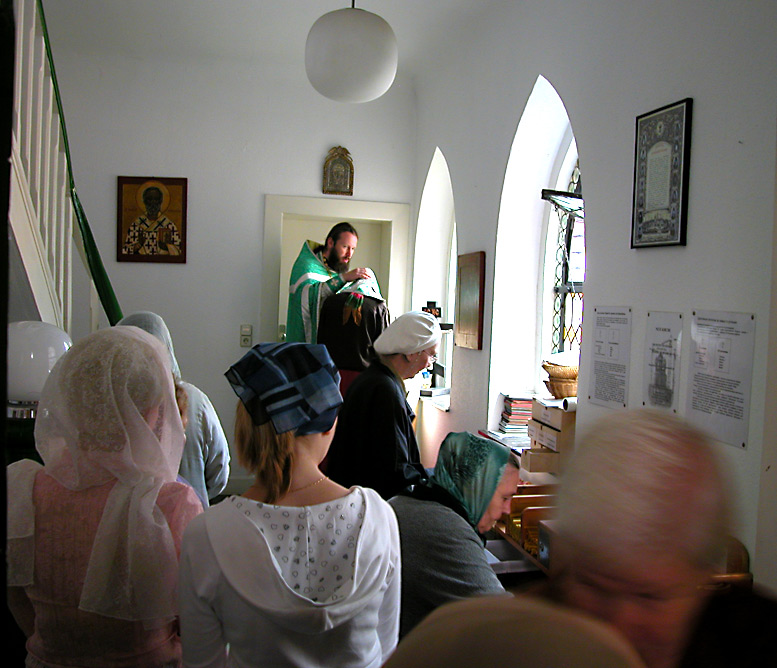
Russian Orthodox priest hearing confessions before Divine Liturgy

In the Eastern Orthodox Church, penance is usually called Sacred Mystery of Confession. In Orthodoxy, the intention of the sacramental mystery of Holy Confession is to provide reconciliation with God through means of healing.

Similar to the Eastern Catholic Churches, in the Eastern Orthodox Church there are no confessionals. Traditionally the penitent stands or kneels before either the Icon of Christ the Teacher (to the viewers' right of the Royal Door) or in front of an Icon of Christ, "Not Made by Hands". This is because in Orthodox sacramental theology, confession is not made to the priest, but to Christ; the priest being there as a witness, friend and advisor. On an analogion in front of the penitent has been placed a Gospel Book and a Crucifix. The penitent venerates the Gospel Book and the cross and kneels. This is to show humility before the whole church and before Christ. Once they are ready to start, the priest says, "Blessed is our God, always, now and ever, and unto the ages of ages," reads the Trisagion Prayers and the Psalm 50 (in the Septuagint; in the KJV this is Psalm 51).

The priest then advises the penitent that Christ is invisibly present and that the penitent should not be embarrassed or be afraid, but should open up their heart and reveal their sins so that Christ may forgive them. The penitent then accuses themselves of sins. The priest quietly and patiently listens, gently asking questions to encourage the penitent not to withhold any sins out of fear or shame. After the confessant reveals all their sins, the priest offers advice and counsel. The priest may modify the prayer rule of the penitent, or even prescribe another rule, if needed to combat the sins the penitent struggles most with. Penances, known as epitemia, are given with a therapeutic intent, so they are opposite to the sin committed.

Epitemia are neither a punishment nor merely a pious action, but are specifically aimed at healing the spiritual ailment that has been confessed. For example, if the penitent broke the Eighth Commandment by stealing something, the priest could prescribe they return what they stole (if possible) and give alms to the poor on a more regular basis. Opposites are treated with opposites. If the penitent suffers from gluttony, the confessant's fasting rule is reviewed and perhaps increased. The intention of Confession is never to punish, but to heal and purify. Confession is also seen as a "second baptism", and is sometimes referred to as the "baptism of tears".

In Orthodoxy, Confession is seen as a means to procure better spiritual health and purity. Confession does not involve merely stating the sinful things the person does; the good things a person does or is considering doing are also discussed. The approach is holistic, examining the full life of the confessant. The good works do not earn salvation, but are part of a psychotherapeutic treatment to preserve salvation and purity. Sin is treated as a spiritual illness, or wound, only cured through Jesus Christ. The Orthodox belief is that in Confession, the sinful wounds of the soul are to be exposed and treated in the "open air" (in this case, the Spirit of God. Note the fact that the Greek word for Spirit (πνευμα), can be translated as "air in motion" or wind).

Once the penitent has accepted the therapeutic advice and counsel freely given to them by the priest, then, placing his epitrachelion over the head of the confessant, the priest says the prayer of forgiveness over the penitent. In the prayer of forgiveness, the priests asks of God to forgive the sins committed. He then concludes by placing his hand on the head of the penitent and says, "The Grace of the All-Holy Spirit, through my insignificance, has loosened and granted to you forgiveness."

In summary, the Priest reminds the penitent what they have received is a second baptism, through the Mystery of Confession, and that they should be careful not to defile this restored purity but to do good and to hear the voice of the psalmist: "Turn from evil and do good" (Psalm 34:14). Most importantly, the priest urges the penitent to guard themselves from sin and to commune as often as permitted. The priest dismisses the repentant one in peace.

==== Lutheranism ====
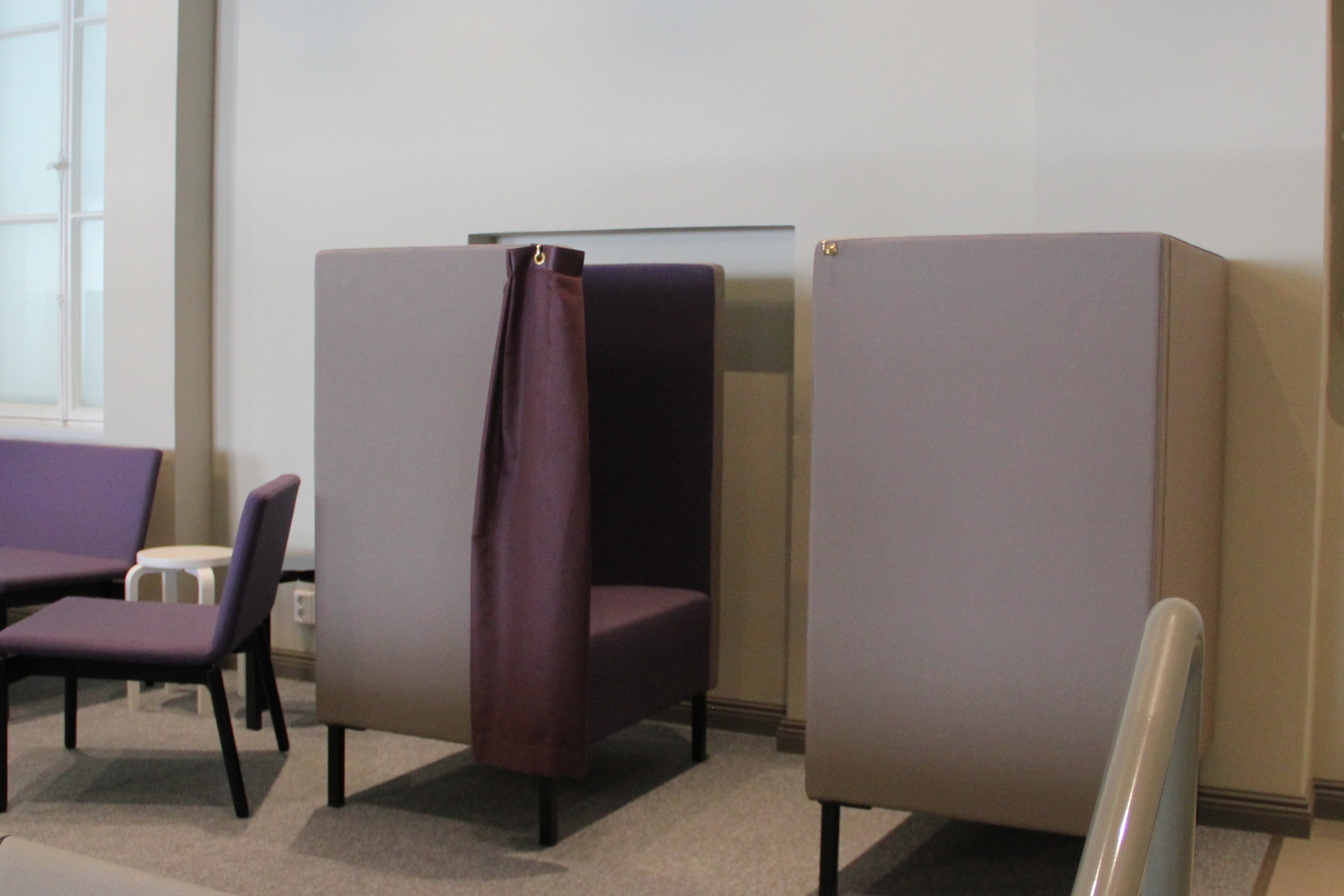
A confessional in Luther Church (Helsinki, Finland)

In mainstream Lutheranism, the faithful often receive the sacrament of confession and absolution from a Lutheran priest before receiving the Eucharist; traditionally, Lutheran churches have offered the sacrament of confession on Saturdays so that individuals are able to receive the Eucharist on the following day.

The Roman Catholic concept of penance differs from the Lutheran sacrament in that the former requires a satisfactio operis "satisfaction of deeds", while the latter teaches that "Absolution is not received except by faith" (Triglotta, p. 269, Aft. XII).

==== Reformed ====
In the Reformed tradition (which includes the Continental Reformed, Presbyterian and Congregationalist denominations), corporate confession is the normative way that confession and absolution is practiced, without penances. The Order of Worship in the Bible Presbyterian Church, for example, enjoins the following:

Each Sunday we have a corporate confession of sins with an announcement of assurance of pardon from sin—this is great news for all believers. We strive to use the form of confession sincerely, to acknowledging our brokenness—in thought, word, and deed—and to receive God's forgiveness through Jesus Christ in thankfulness.

==== Anglicanism ====
Private confession of sins to a priest, followed by absolution, has always been provided for in the Book of Common Prayer. There is no formal concept of penance.

==== Methodism ====
John Wesley, the founder of the Methodist movement, held "the validity of Anglican practice in his day as reflected in the 1662 Book of Common Prayer", stating that "We grant confession to men to be in many cases of use: public, in case of public scandal; private, to a spiritual guide for disburdening of the conscience, and as a help to repentance." Additionally, per the recommendation of John Wesley, Methodist class meetings traditionally meet weekly in order to confess sins to one another. No penances are involved.

== Penance in Indian beliefs ==
In Hinduism, acts of hardship committed on oneself (fasting, lying on rocks heated by the Sun, etc.), especially as part of an ascetic way of life (as monk or 'wise man') in order to attain a higher form of mental awareness (through detachment from the earthly, not punishing guilt) or favours from god(s) are considered penance. In Hinduism penance is widely discussed in Dharmasastra literature. In the Gita, there is a warning against excessive "penance" of a merely physical nature. There is the special term "Tapas", for intense concentration that is like a powerful fire, and this used to be sometimes translated as "penance", although the connotations are different.

The Indian spiritual teacher Meher Baba stated that "When penance is carefully nourished and practiced, it inevitably results in the mental revocation of undesirable modes of thought and conduct, and makes one amenable to a life of purity and service."

== Penance in art and fiction ==
Art:

- A Procession of Flagellants (1812–1819)

Films:

- Penance (film) (2009)
- Sadhna (1958) a.k.a. The Penance
- The Bell of Penance (1912)
- A Daughter of Penance (1916)
- Proper Penance (1992) (V)
- The Mission (1986)
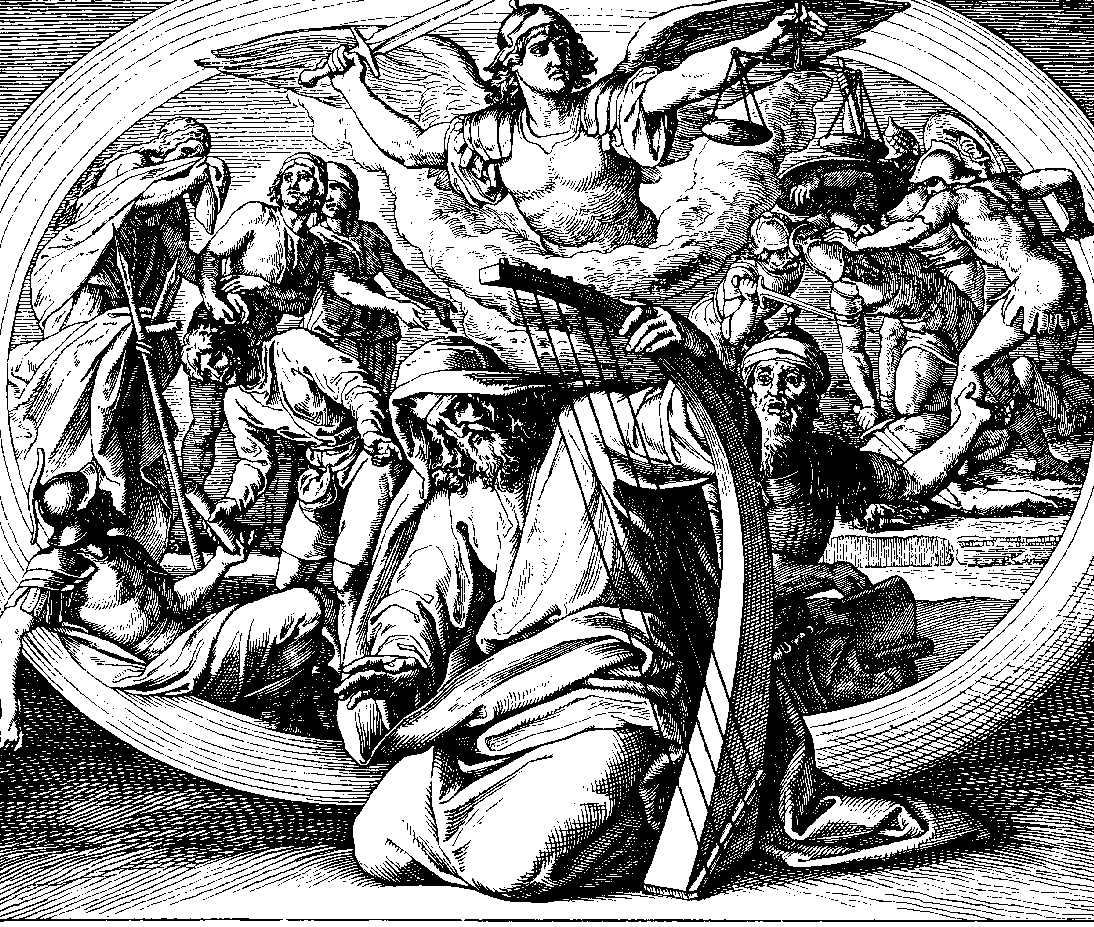
David is depicted giving a penitential psalm in this 1860 woodcut by Julius Schnorr von Karolsfeld.

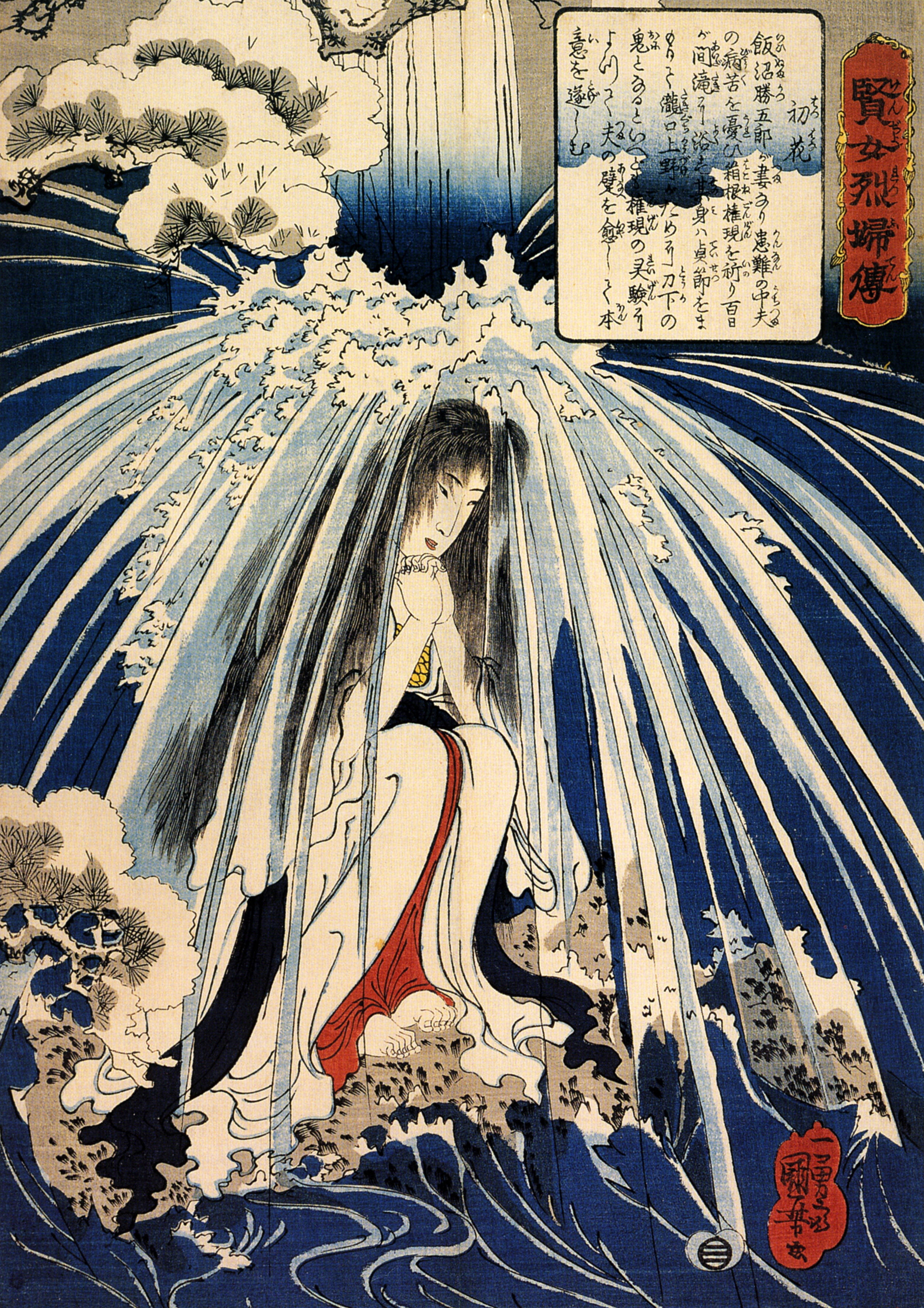
Hatsuhana doing penance under the Tonosawa waterfall (woodblock print by Utagawa Kuniyoshi, 1798–1861).

== See also ==
- Mortal sin
- Order of Penitents
- Order of Penance, an early name for the Friars Minor
- Prayer for the dead
- Repentance in Judaism
- Al-Kaffarah in Islam
