= Weli-Ahmed Hakim =

Finnish Tatar imam

- Вәлиәхмәт Хәким ولى احمد حكيم
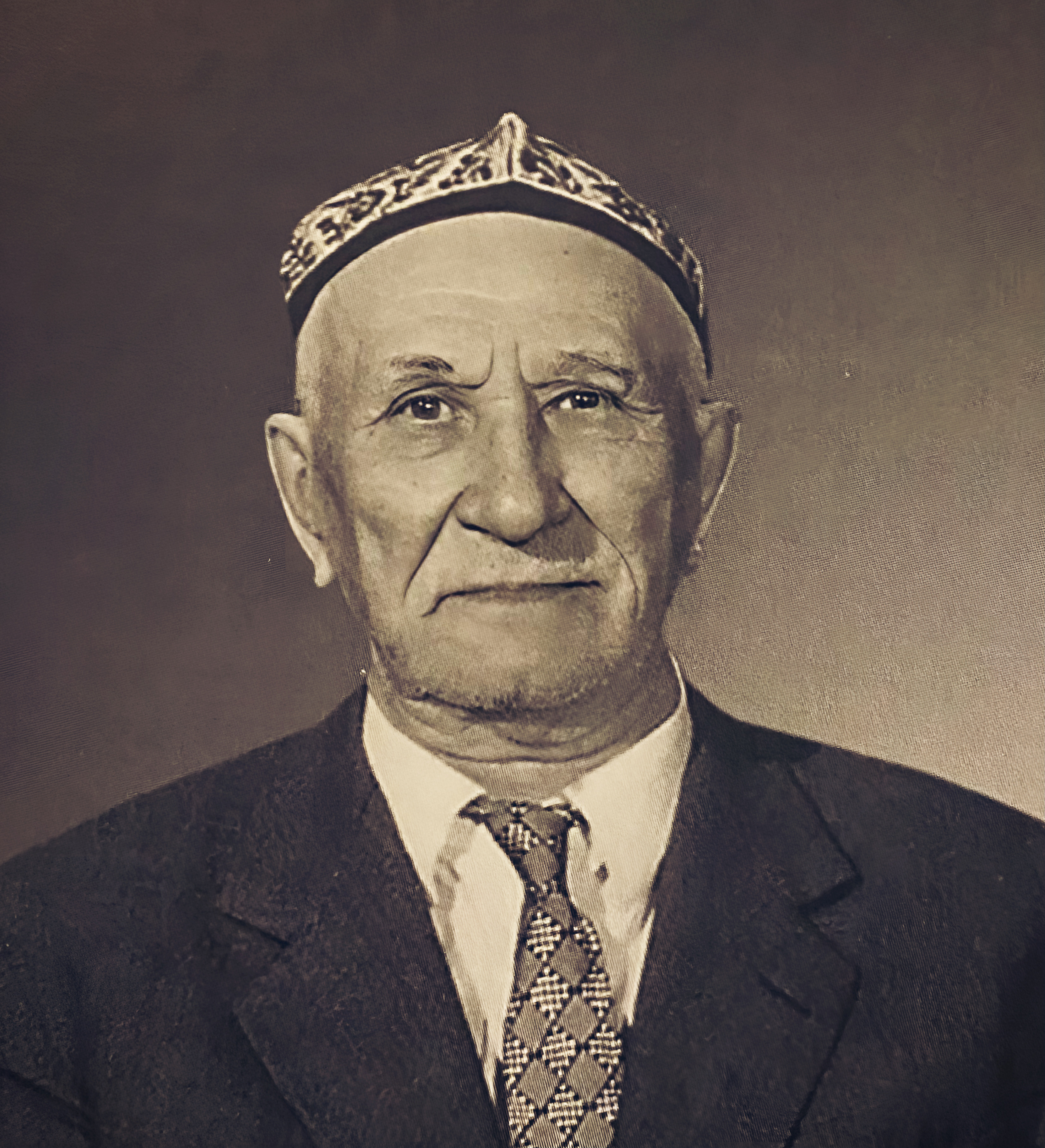
- Hakim in 1950
- Born: 27 July 1882; Olı Rbişça, Russian Empire (now Nizhny Novgorod Oblast, Russia)
- Died: 28 November 1970 (aged 88); Helsinki, Finland
- Other names: Abdulhakimoff
- Occupation: Imam
- Years active: 1914-1962
- Successor: Ahmet Naim Atasever (Helsinki); Habiburrahman Shakir (Tampere)
- Spouse: Aliye Sadri
- Children: 5; Nazime, Nadiye, Ilhamiye, Kadriye, Fuad
- Honours: Honorary member of The Finnish-Islamic Congregation

Weli-Ahmed Hakim (Note: Tatar: Вәлиәхмәт Хәким, romanized: Wäliäxmät Xäkim, Tatar pronunciation: [wæ.li.æχˈmæt ˈχæ.kim]) (né Abdulhakimoff; (Note: Russian: Абдулхакимов) 27 July 1882 – 28 November 1970) was a Tatar founding member and a long-time imam of The Finnish-Islamic Congregation. Hakim also operated as imam in Tampere. Hakim was a key figure in organizing religious gatherings before a Tatar congregation was established. Hakim is also mentioned as a major contributor in helping Islamic theologians and Idel-Ural State refugees in Finland, and taking a part in the forming of Tatar community in Narva, Estonia.

== Biography ==
Weli-Ahmed Abdulhakimoff was born in the village of Olı Rbişça (Russian: Большое Рыбушкино, romanized: Bolshoye Rybushkino), in the Nizhny Novgorod Governorate of the Russian Empire. He moved to Finland in 1914 and acquired citizenship in 1926.

Hakim was a founding member of the Helsinki-based Tatar congregation, The Finnish-Islamic Congregation, and for decades operated as its main imam. The local Tatar community invited Hakim after the previous imam, Semiulla Sadretdinoff moved to Turku. Hakim got his imam's training in Ufa. He had also studied in Medina and Mecca. Before his vocation in Finland, Hakim was the imam in Kasimov and also for example worked as a teacher in Moscow.

The predecessor to the Tatar congregation, Suomen musulmaanien hyväntekeväisyysseura (1915, lit. 'Finnish Mohammedan Charity Club') at first organized their gatherings at Hakim's home in Helsinki. The main building of The Finnish-Islamic Congregation was completed in 1961 and is located on a street called Fredrikinkatu.

Hakim operated as the imam of the congregation until 1962. His successor was Ahmet Naim Atasever. He was also the imam for the Tatars of Tampere, until Habiburrahman Shakir started in 1947. Hakim designed the Arabic texts for the Finnish Tatar tombstones. Hakim also performed his services as Imam in Estonia. He played an important role in the creation of the Tatar community in Narva.

Hakim was also known for teaching the children of his community and in 1939 publishing a work called Türk balalarınıñ din deslerı I-II (lit. 'The Religious Textbooks of Turkish Children'). Hakim was aligned with Pan-Turkism. When referring to his community, he avoided the term "Tatar" and rather identified them as "Turks". (turkkilainen in Finnish).

Hakim has been named as the honorary member of The Finnish-Islamic Congregation. In addition to his work as an imam, he had a major contribution in helping the Islamic theologians and Idel-Ural State leaders when they came to Finland, and fellow Mishars arriving from Nizhny Novgorod Oblast. Hakim was in close contact with Jadidists who were visiting the country. Hakim has been called a talented speaker, who recited the Quran with a melodic voice.

Weli-Ahmed Hakim died in Helsinki on 28 November 1970. His spouse was Aliye Hakim (née Sadri) and children Nazime, Nadiye, Ilhamiye, Kadriye and Fuad.

== Name versions ==
Weli-Ahmed Hakim, Veli Ahmet Hakim, Vali Ahmed Abdulhakimov, Valiahmet Hakimov, Ahmet Hakimoff, W. Hakimoff.

In Literary Tatar, the name is Вәлиәхмәт Хәким, Wäliäxmät Xäkim / Wəliəxmət Xəkim. İske İmlâ: ولى احمد حكيم

== Citations and references ==
=== Cited sources ===
- Muazzez Baibulat: The Tampere Islamic Congregation: the roots and history. Gummerus Kirjapaino Oy 2004, Jyväskylä. ISBN 952-91-6753-9.
- Tervonen, Miikka & Leinonen Johanna (toim.): Vähemmistöt muuttajina - Näkökulmia suomalaisen muuttoliikehistorian moninaisuuteen. Painosalama Oy, Turku 2021. ISBN 978-952-7399-09-5.
