= Confessional =

Small, enclosed booth used for confession

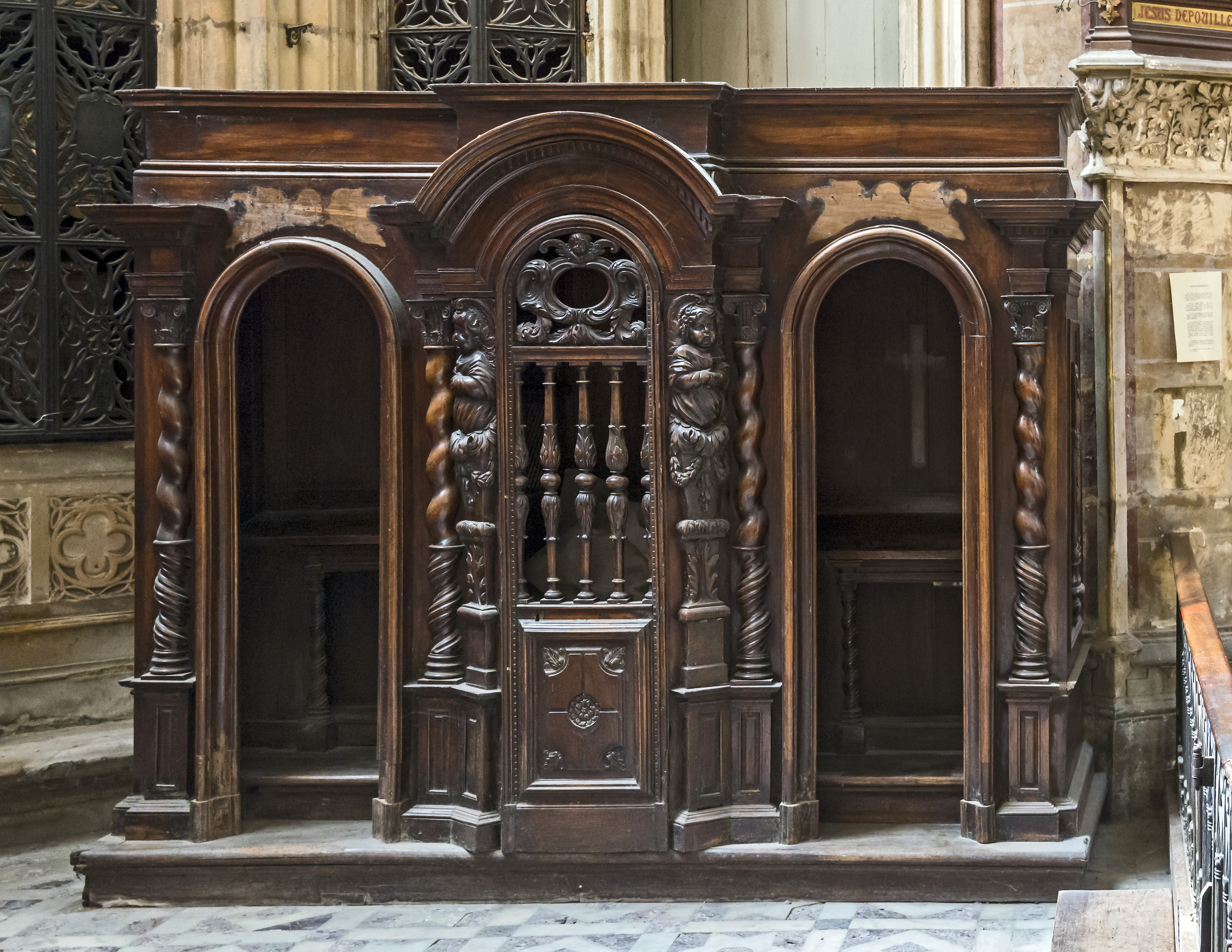
Confessional at the Toulouse Cathedral

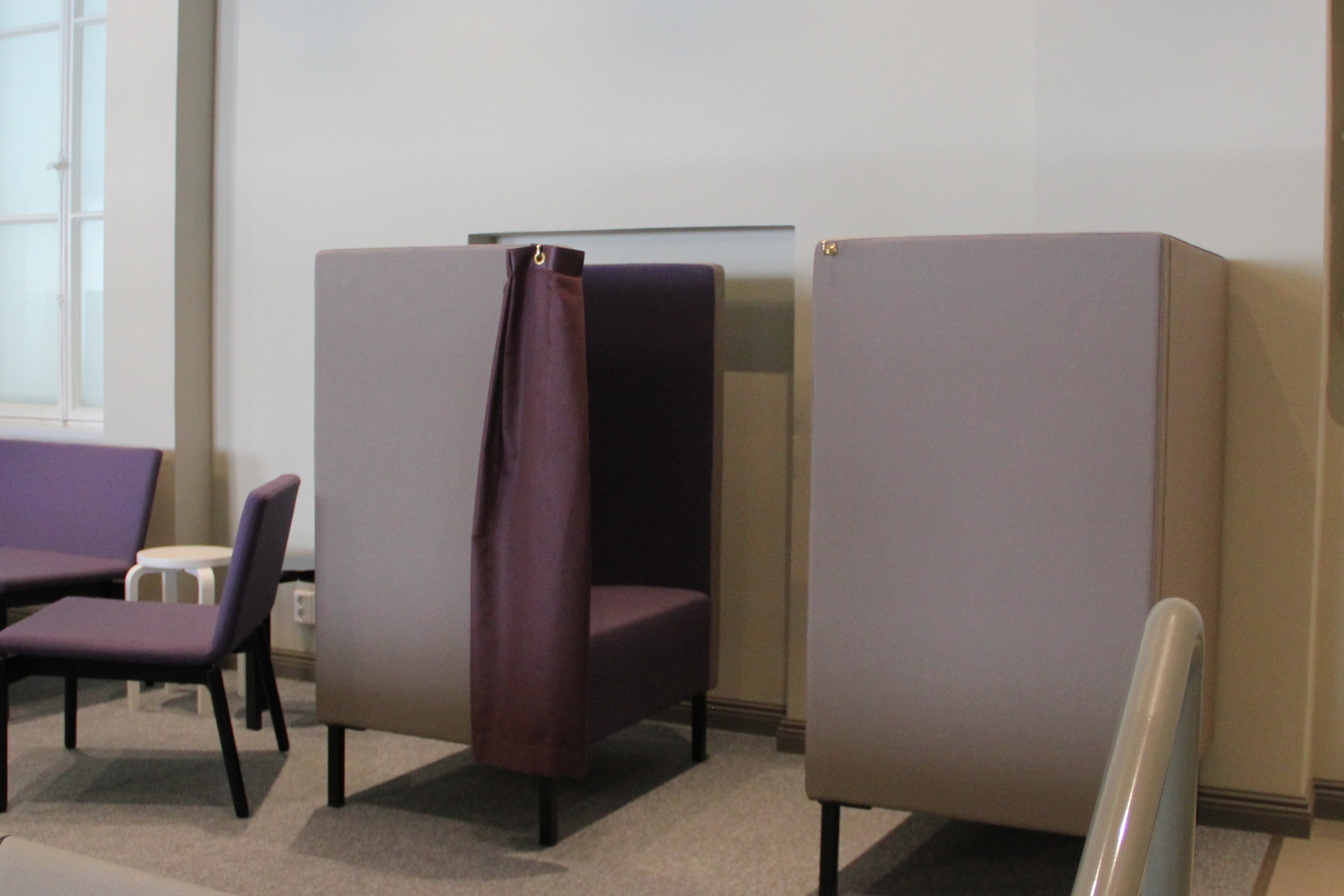
A confessional in Luther Church (Helsinki, Finland)

A confessional is a box, cabinet, booth, stall or room where the priest from some Christian denominations sits to hear the confessions of a penitent's sins. It is the traditional venue for the sacrament in the Catholic Church and the Lutheran Churches, but similar structures are also used in Anglican churches of an Anglo-Catholic orientation. In the Catholic Church, confessions should occur only in a confessional or oratory, except under special circumstances or just reason.

The confessional is usually a wooden structure, with a centre compartment—entered through a door or curtain—where the priest sits, and on each side there is a latticed opening for the penitents to speak through and a step on which they kneel. By this arrangement the priest is hidden, but the penitent is visible to the public. Confessionals sometimes form part of the architectural scheme of the church; many finely decorated specimens, dating from the late 16th and the 17th centuries, are found in churches on the continent of Europe. A notable example, in Renaissance style, is in the Saint Michael's church at Leuven, but more usually, confessionals are movable pieces of furniture.

In modern practice of the Catholic, Lutheran and Anglican churches, apart from receiving absolution in the confessional, many churches offer private Confession and Absolution at the chancel rails, as well as during communal penitential rites (cf. General Confession). Modern-built Catholic churches and Lutheran churches often have a reconciliation room, in which the sacrament of confession may be administered. These reconciliation rooms normatively "contain two chairs and a screen with a kneeler" in which a believer may sit facing the priest, or kneel behind a screen for anonymity.

In Eastern Orthodoxy and Oriental Orthodoxy confessionals are not used: the confession often occurs in sight of other believers, e.g., those waiting in the row for the same purpose, but at some distance from them to not break the "seal of confession". The "seal of confession" is technically of Roman and Lutheran usage.

== History ==
The confessional in its modern form dates no further back than the 16th century. Du Cange cites the year 1563 for an early use of the word confessionale for the sacrum poenitentiae tribunal. The term was applied to the burial place of a martyr or "confessor", that being one who confesses Christ. There are also instances where the name was attached to the spot, whether cell or seat, where noted saints had a habit of hearing confessions. For example, the confessional of Church of St. Trophime at Arles.

In the popular Reformed view, confessional boxes are associated with the scandals, real or supposed, of the practice of auricular confession. However, the boxes were devised to guard against such scandals by securing at once essential publicity and a reasonable privacy, and by separating priest and penitent. In the Middle Ages corresponding and stringent rules were established in canon law for confessions by women, and especially by nuns.

In England, before the Protestant Reformation, publicity was reckoned the best safeguard. Thus Archbishop Walter Reynolds, in 1322, says in his Constitutions: "Let the priest choose for himself a common place for hearing confessions, where he may be seen generally by all in the church; and do not let him hear any one, and especially any woman, in a private place, except in great necessity.".

In Italy, men's confessions were heard in the sacristy face to face, or the priest would draw aside the central confessional curtain which separated him the rest of the church and hear a man's confession. Women's confessions were heard in the confessional with a screen between priest and penitent. The maxim,"numquam solus cum sola" was strictly enforced by this method. Hearing a man's confession in the box became common in the United States for convenience sake as sacristies were not as vast as they were in Italian churches.

It would seem that the priest usually heard confessions at the chancel opening or at a bench end in the nave near the chancel. There is, however, in some churchwardens' accounts mention of a special seat: "the shryving stool", "shriving pew" or "shriving place". (On a related note, the observance of Shrove Tuesday is named after the practice of shriving/confession.) At Lenham, in Kent, there is an ancient armchair in stone, with a stone bench and steps on one side, that appears to be a confessional.

With the revival of the practice of auricular confession in the Church of England, confessionals were introduced into some parishes with an Anglo-Catholic bent. Since, however, they formed no part of "the furniture of the church" in the "second year of King Edward VI", some have argued that they are not covered by the "Ornaments Rubric" in the Prayer-Book. The question of their legality was raised in 1900 in the case of Davey v. Hinde (vicar of the Church of the Annunciation at Brighton), tried before Dr Tristram in the consistory court of Chichester. They were condemned "on the ground that they are not articles of church furniture requisite for or conducive to conformity with the doctrine or practice of the Church of England in relation to the reception of confession".

"Confessional", in the sense of a due payable for the right to hear confession, is now obsolete.

== Gallery ==
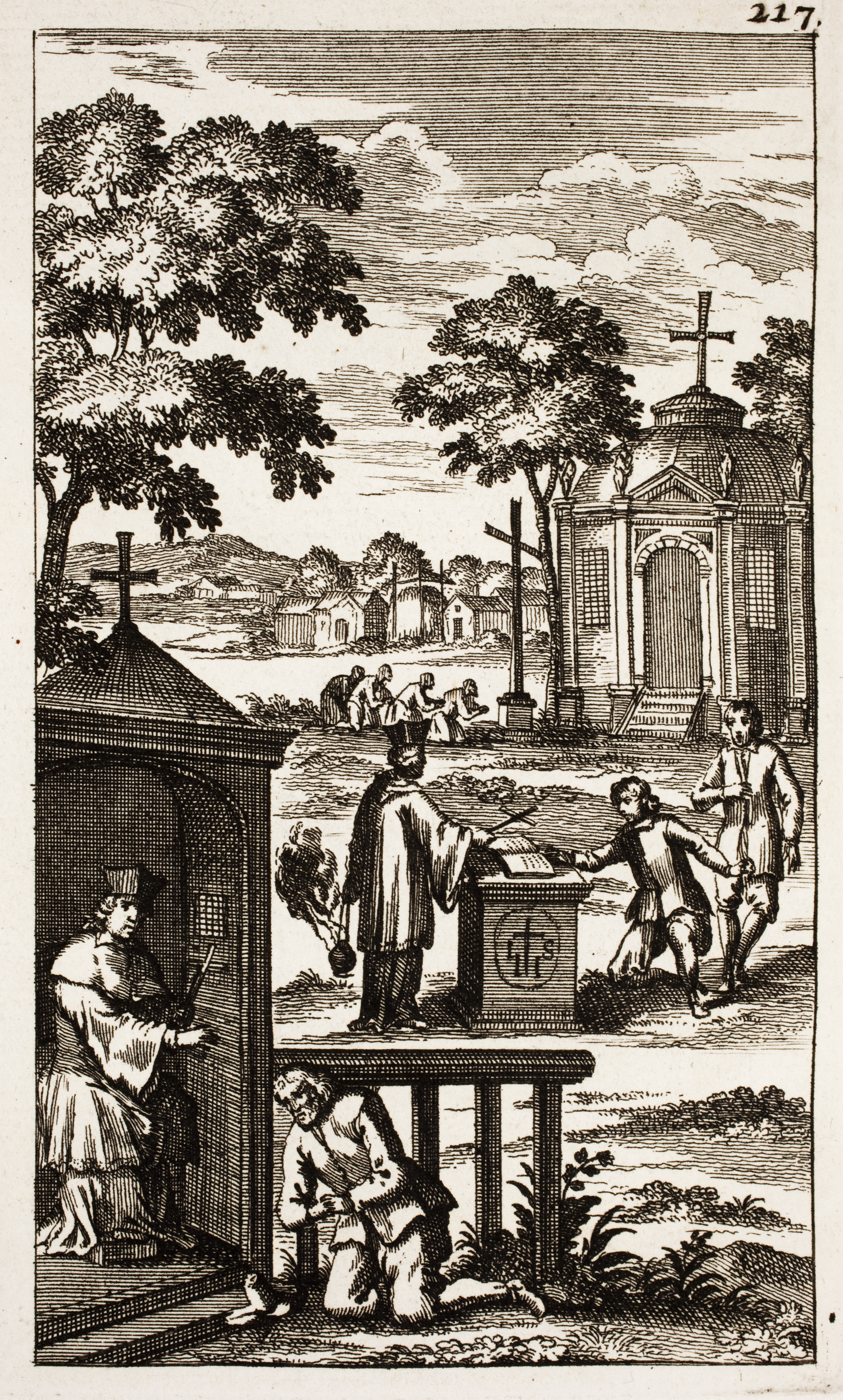
Confessional in the open air in art. Cornelis van Alkemade: Behandeling van 't kamp regt, 1740

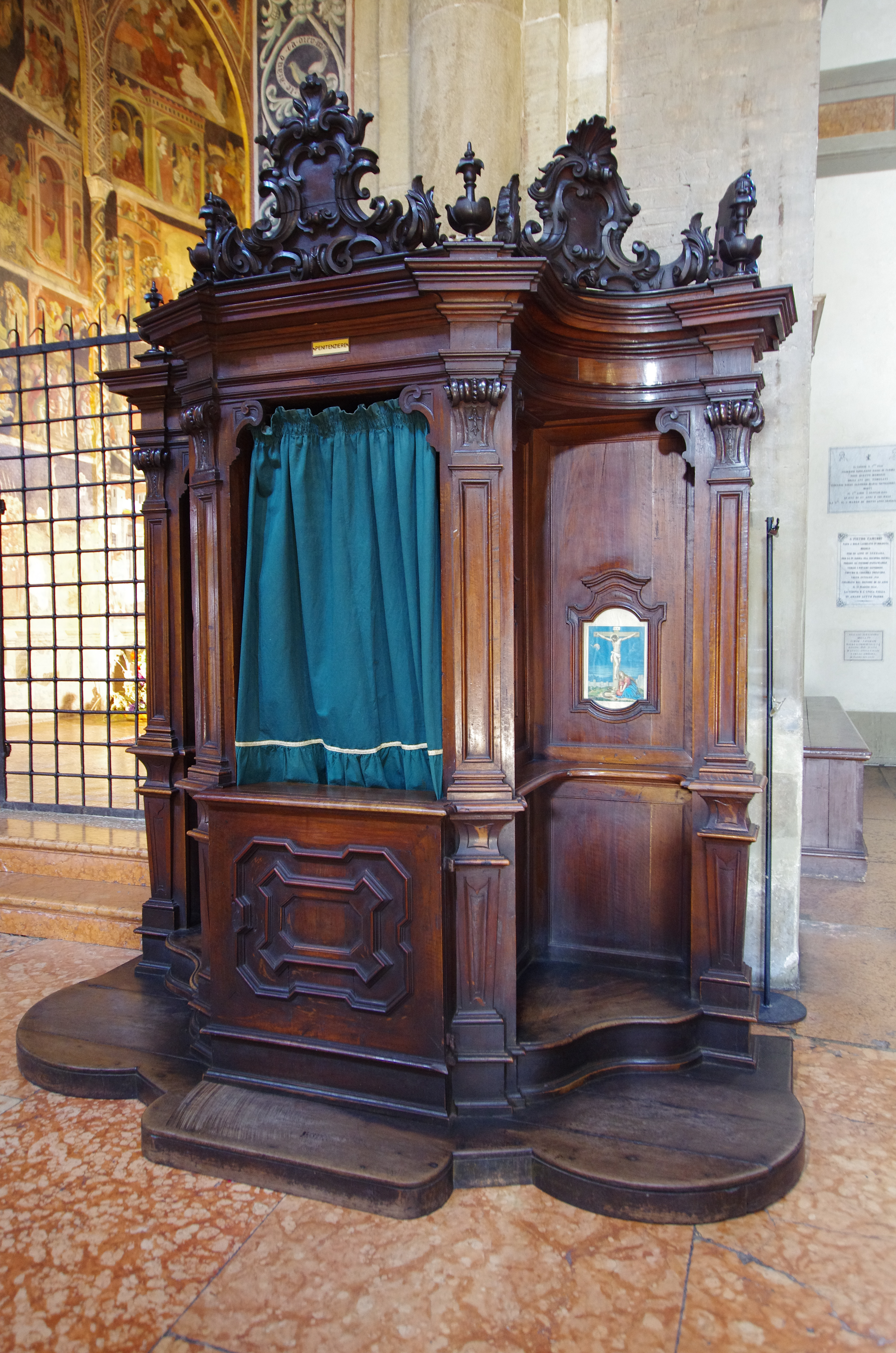
Confessional at the Parma Cathedral

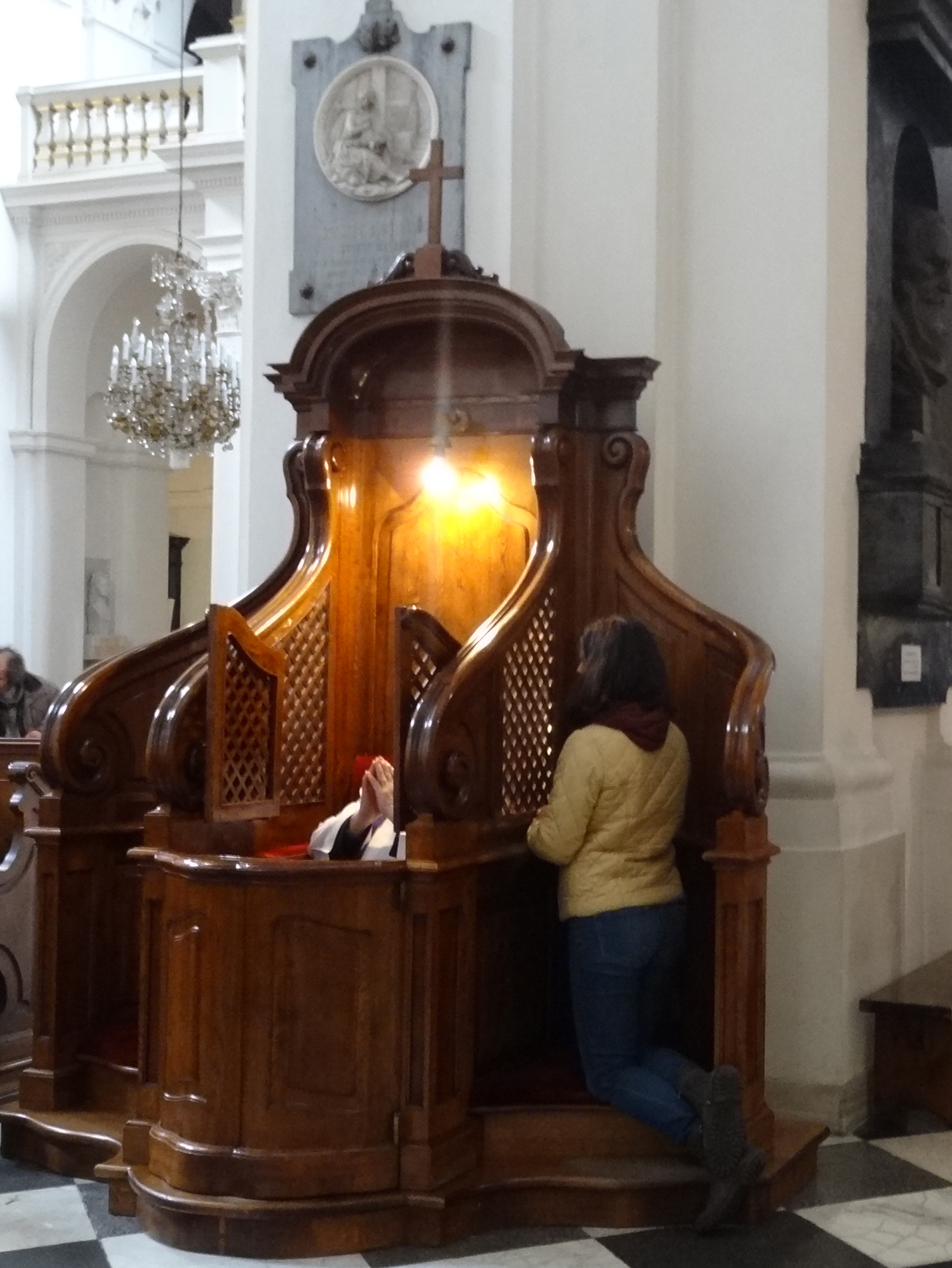
A confessional in the Roman Catholic Holy Cross Church in time of a confession, Warsaw, Poland

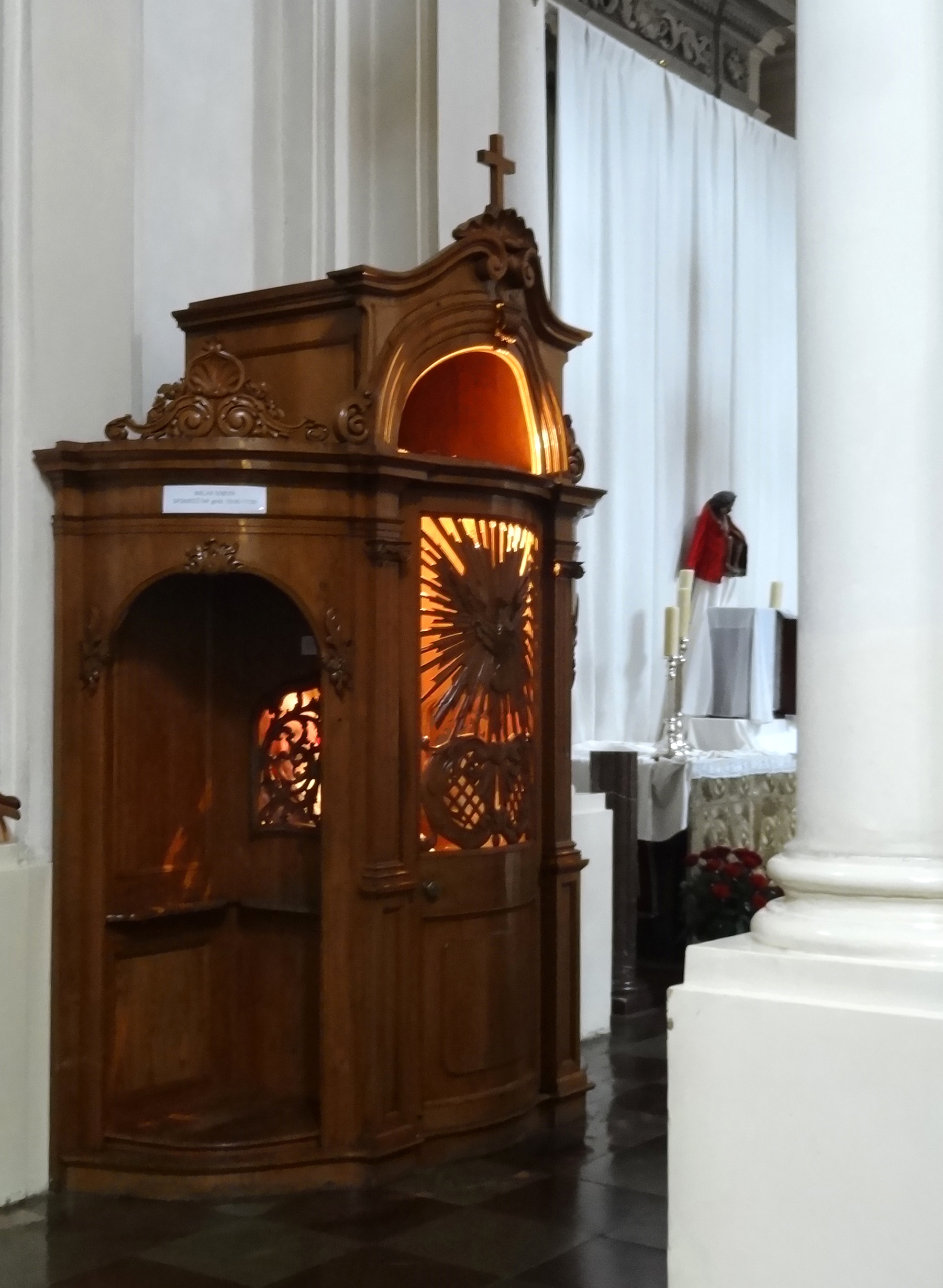
A confessional in the Roman Catholic Visitationist Church with the light on to signal a priest is waiting inside, Warsaw, Poland

A reconciliation room at Uppsala Cathedral (Evangelical-Lutheran) in Sweden

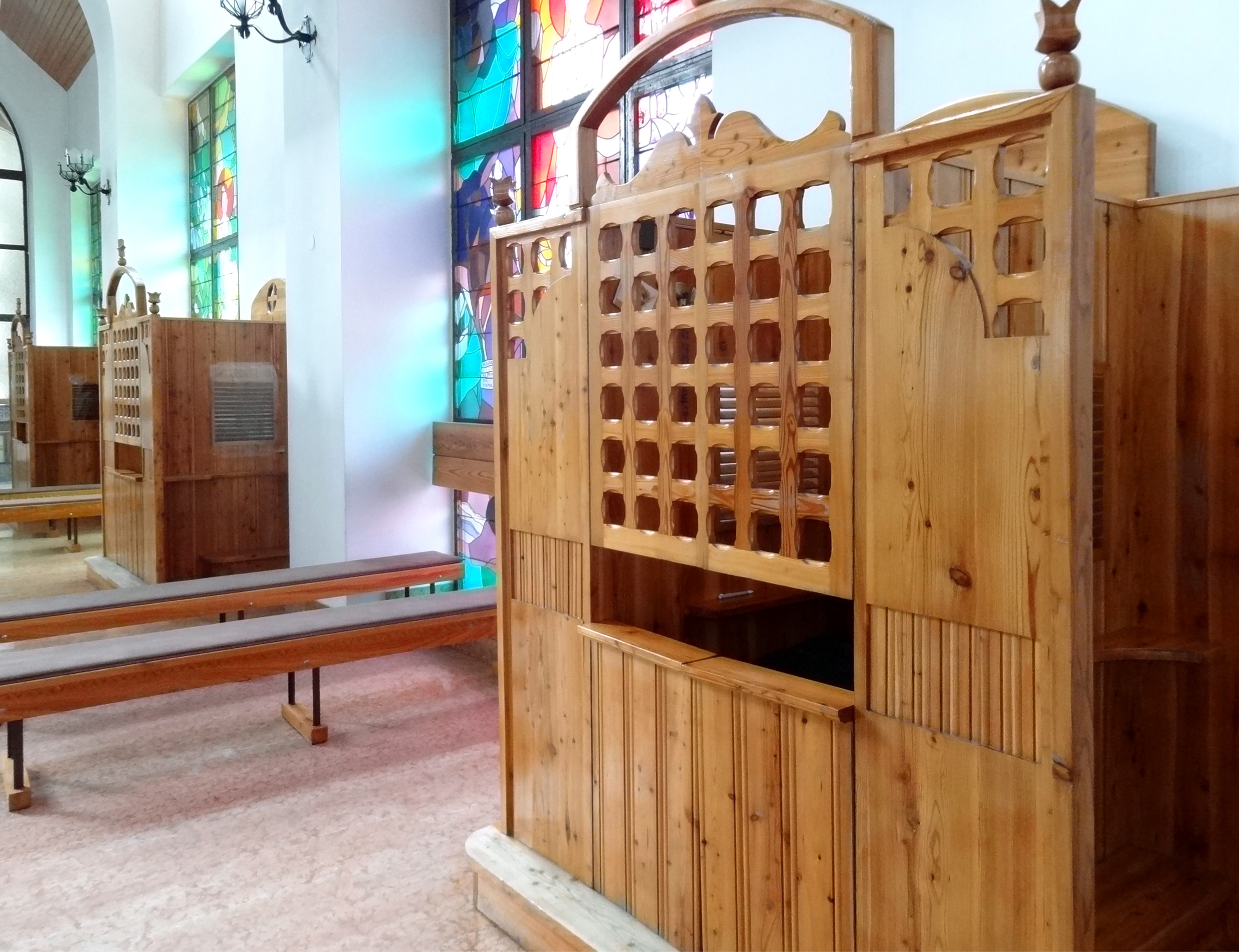
Three wooden confessionals in a row in a Roman Catholic church, Zakopane, Poland

== See also ==
- sub rosa
