= Finnish-Islamic Congregation =

Islamic congregation of Finnish Tatars

The Finnish-Islamic Congregation
- Suomen Islam-seurakunta; Finlandiya İslam Cemaati
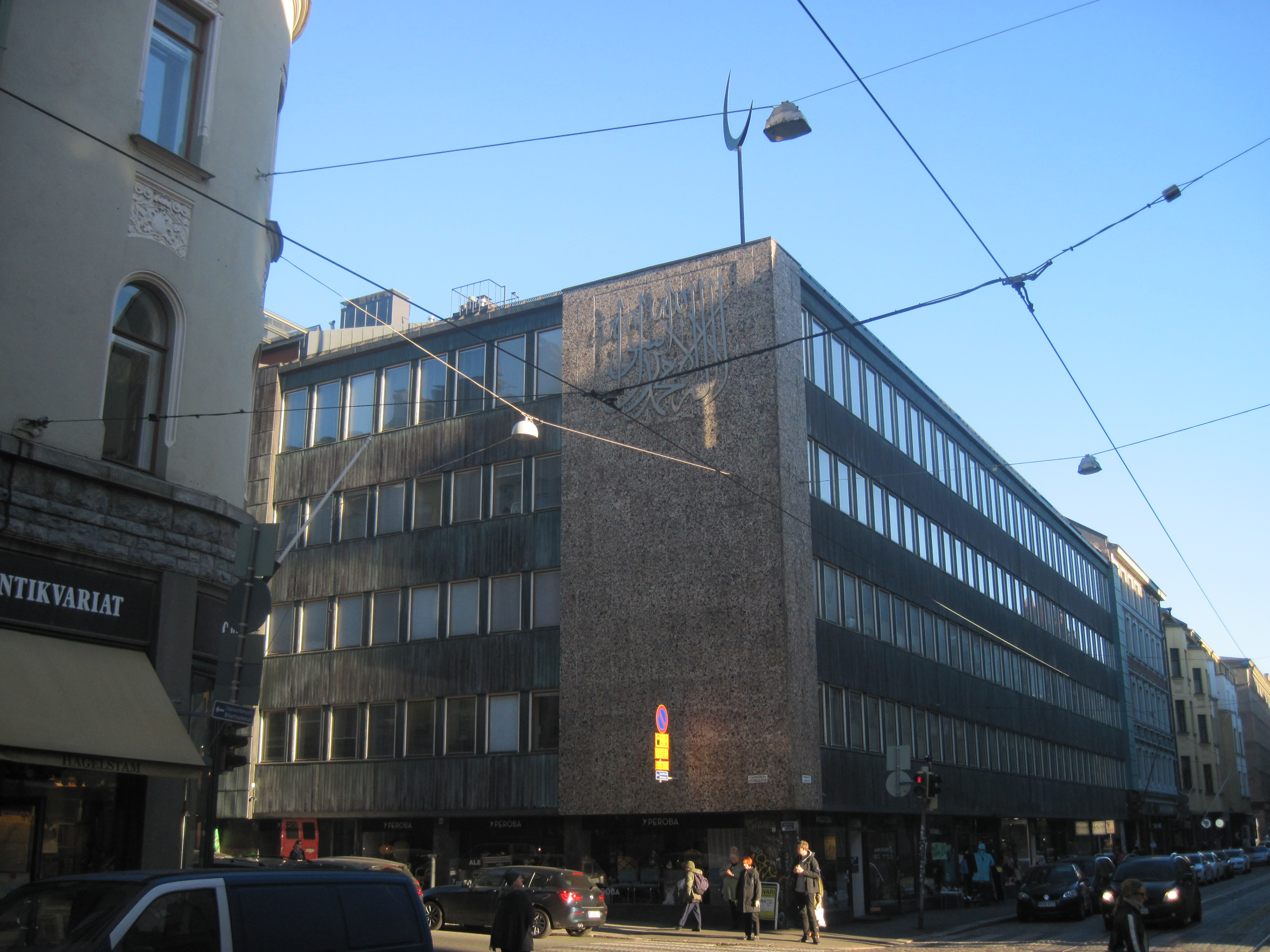
- The "Islam house" (İslam yortı) of the Congregation, in Fredrikinkatu, Helsinki

Religion
- Affiliation: Sunni Islam
- Sect: Hanafi

Location
- Location: Helsinki, Finland; 60.163546°N, 24.938476°E
- Interactive map of The Finnish-Islamic Congregation

Architecture
- Established: 1925

Website
- https://tatar.fi

The Finnish-Islamic Congregation (Finnish: Suomen Islam-seurakunta, Tatar: Finlandiya İslam Cemaati (Note: Finnish Tatars have had a lot of influence from Turkish culture and thus, the Tatar language name of the congregation is spelled in Turkish. In Standard Tatar, it would be Finləndiyə İslam Cəmğiyəte, Финляндия Ислам Җәмгияте.)) is an Islamic congregation of the Tatar people in Finland. It was founded in 1925 as the first Islamic congregation in Finland. The congregation has activity in Helsinki, Järvenpää, Kotka and Turku. Its headquarters is located in Helsinki.

Many international politicians have visited the congregation. These include the head of Tatarstan, Rustam Minnikhanov, and the president of Turkey, Recep Tayyip Erdoğan.

The imam of the congregation since 2004 is Ramil Belyaev.

== History ==
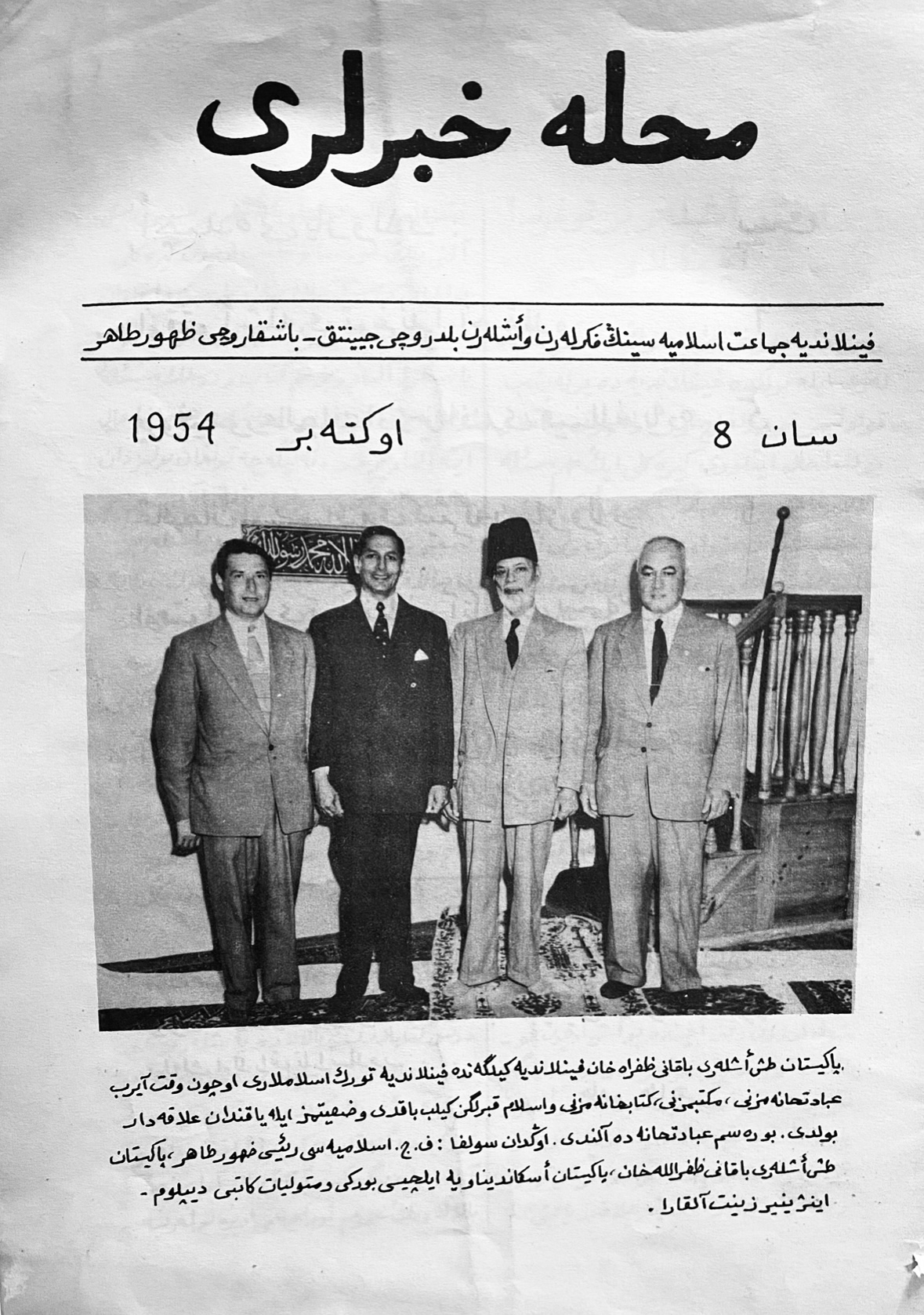
"Mahelle Haberleri", the congregation's Tatar language newspaper from 1954

The first Muslim people in Finland were Tatars. They arrived between the late 1800s and early 1900s as merchants from the Russian Empire. They were mainly Mishar Tatars.

After settling in the country, they shortly felt the need to organize officially. The predecessor to the congregation was created in 1915, and its name was Helsingin musulmaanien hyväntekeväisyysseura (The Charity Club of Helsinki Moslems). They often held their services at the house of Weli-Ahmed Hakim, who would also become a founding member and long-time imam of the congregation.

Due to laws at the time, these Muslim merchants could not establish an actual congregation in the beginning, but after the freedom of religion law was passed in 1922, it was possible. The congregation was officially registered in 1925.

The name of the congregation was at first Suomen muhamettilainen seurakunta (The Finnish Mohammedan Congregation). It was changed in 1963 to its current version. The first administration consisted of following people; Weli Ahmed Hakim, Ymär Abdrahim, Nur-Muhammed Ali, Ismael Arifulla and Imad Samaletdin. Imam-Hakim also became the first chairman of the congregation. He has later been named an honorary member.

During those times, the congregation was not yet officially only for Tatars, but back then, there were almost no other Muslims in the country.

== Facilities ==
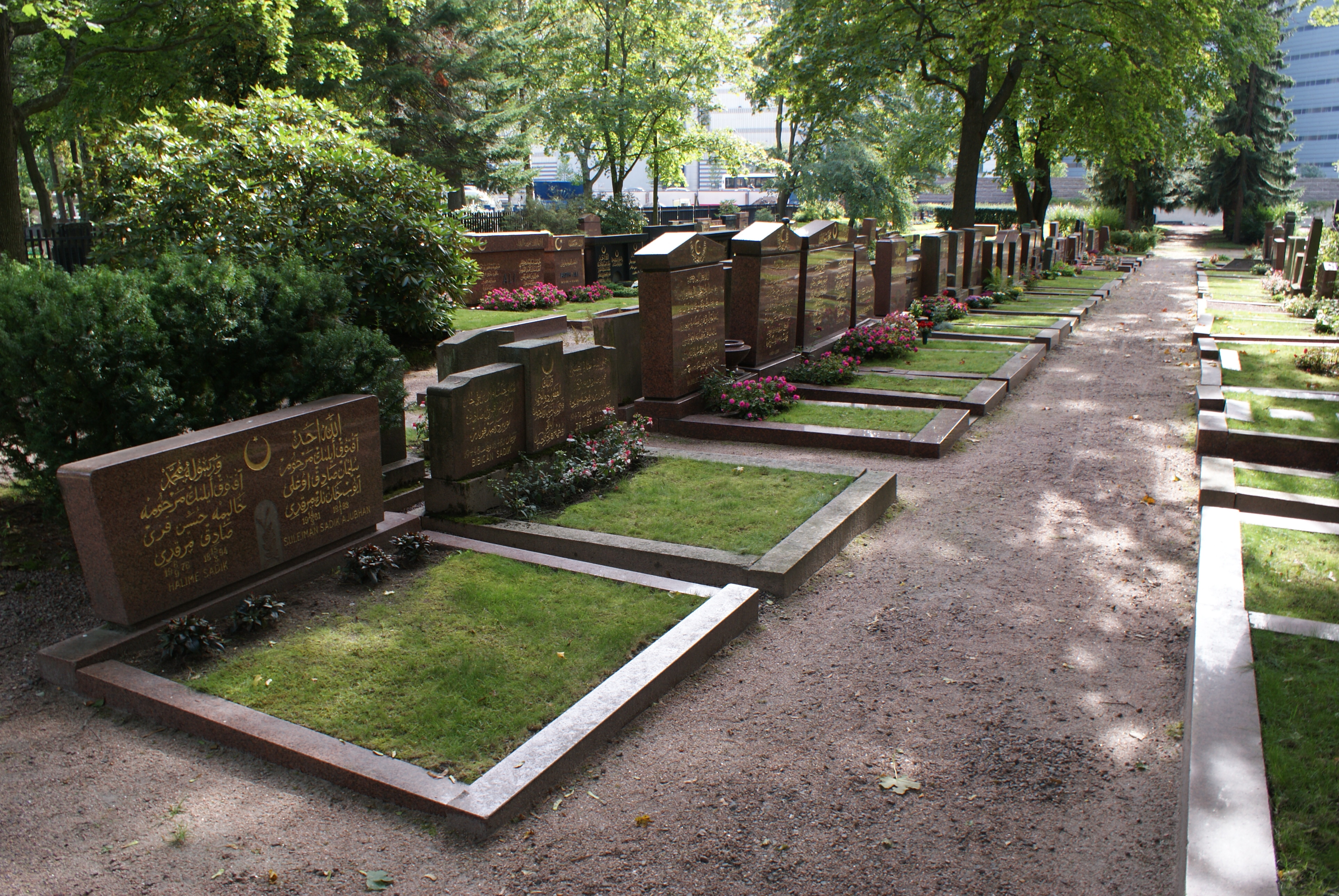
Tatar Cemetery in Helsinki, Hietaniemi

In 1941, the congregation acquired a house from the Helsinki street Fredrikinkatu. In 1948, it bought a wooden house located on the same street. In its place the current building was built between 1958 and 1961, designed by a Finnish man, Armas Lahtinen. The cost was 170 million Finnish Marks, and it was funded with loans and donations. The congregation received five million marks from Pakistan and Turkey, and 600,000 marks from Morocco. In 1970s, the congregation received a wooden mihrab as a gift from the president of Iraq, Ahmed Hassan al-Bakr. The congregation owns the entire building, though only a couple of floors are in use and the rest is rented. The Finnish Islamic Congregation is fairly wealthy and therefore does not require taxes from its members.

In addition to the main building in Helsinki, the congregation owns the Järvenpää Mosque and also chapels in Turku and Kotka. The Tatars in Tampere have their own congregation. The Finnish-Islamic Congregation has cemeteries in Hietaniemi (Helsinki) and Turku. Before losing the area, Viipuri (now Vyborg) also had a space for the deceased Muslims.

== Orientation ==
The Tatar people practice Hanafi Sunni Islam. Many of the younger generation of Tatars are secularized, while the older generations are more devout. The congregation is heavily tied to the Tatar ethnic identity; it does not try to convert others and only accepts Tatars and their spouses (after a three-year trial) as its members. Other Muslims can however come and pray during services.

== List of chairmen ==
- Gölten Bedretdin (2020–present)
- Atik Ali (2012–2020)
- Okan Daher (1988–2012)
- Abdullah Ali (1982–1988)
- Osman Ali (1961–1982)
- Zuhur Tahir (1929–1961)
- Ismail Arifulla (1928–1929)
- Kemal Baibulat (1926–1928)
- Weli-Ahmed Hakim (1926–1926)

== List of imams ==
- Ramil Belyaev (2004–present)
- Enver Yıldırım
- Abdurrahman Kaya
- Ahmet Naim Atasever
- Weli-Ahmed Hakim (1925–1962)

Yıldırım, Kaya and Atasever were from Turkey. Kaya returned as the imam in 2000, until retiring in 2004, after which Belyaev started.

== See also ==
- Tatars
- Finnish Tatars
- Järvenpää Mosque
- The Tampere Tatar Congregation
- European Islam
- Islam in Europe
- Islam in Finland
