= Islam in Finland =

Islam in Europe by percentage of country population 95–100%: Azerbaijan; 90–95%: Turkey; Kosovo; 50–70%: Albania; Bosnia and Herzegovina; Kazakhstan; 30–35%: North Macedonia; 10–20%: France; Georgia; Montenegro; 5–10%: Austria; Belgium; Bulgaria; Denmark; Germany; Liechtenstein; Luxembourg; Netherlands; Russia; Sweden; Switzerland; United Kingdom; 4–5%: Serbia; 2–4%: Italy; Finland; Norway; Malta; Slovenia; Spain; Greece; Cyprus (Note: Only takes into account the Muslim population residing on land controlled by the Republic of Cyprus.); 1–2%: Croatia; Ireland; Ukraine; Andorra; < 1%: Iceland; Armenia; Belarus; Czech Republic; Estonia; Hungary; Latvia; Lithuania; Moldova; Monaco; Poland; Portugal; Romania; San Marino; Slovakia

Finland is a Christian majority country, with Islam being a minority faith. The constitution of Finland ensures freedom of religion and Muslims are free to proselytize and build places of worship in the country.

The first Muslims were Tatars who immigrated to Finland mainly between 1870 and 1920. Since the late 20th century the number of Muslims in Finland has increased due to immigration. Nowadays, there are dozens of Islamic communities in Finland, but only a minority of Muslims have joined them. According to the Finland official census (2021), there are 20,876 people in Finland belonging to registered Muslim communities, representing 0.37% of the total population. However, majority of Muslims in Finland do not belong to any registered communities. It is estimated that there are between 120,000 and 130,000 Muslims in Finland (2.3%).

== Baltic Tatars ==
The Baltic Tatars arrived in Finland as merchants and soldiers at the end of the 19th century. They were adherents of Sunni Islam and spoke one of the Turkic languages. They were later joined by other family members and formed the first Islamic congregation, the Finnish-Islamic Congregation (Finnish: Suomen Islam-seurakunta), which was founded in 1925, after Finland declared its full independence (1917). The year 1922 was when a law on religious freedom was passed. In practice, this society only accepts people from Tatar origin, or Turkic origin in general, as members, excluding non-Turkic speaking Muslims. The Finnish Tatars's Islamic congregations have a total of about 1,000 members these days. By and large, Tatars remained the only Muslims in Finland until the start of the 1960s.

== Modern immigration ==
By the early 1980s, several hundred Muslims predominantly from the Middle East and North Africa (MENA) had immigrated as students, laborers and spouses. In 1987 they formed the Islamic Society of Finland association.

Due to the number of immigrants and refugees, the number of Muslims in Finland rose considerably in the early 1990s, predominantly they were from the aforementioned MENA countries as well as Somalia and the Balkans. Soon new immigrants established their own mosques and societies. In 1996 these groups came together to form a cooperative organ - the Federation of Islamic Organizations in Finland. It is estimated that approximately 1,000 Finns have converted to Islam. The vast majority of these are women who have married Muslim men.

By 2003, the number of Muslims had increased to 20,000, up from just 2,700 in 1990. There were also about 30 mosques. The majority of Muslims were Sunni as well as some Shia refugees from Iraq.

Like most countries in Western Europe, Muslims tend to live in the larger cities of Finland like Helsinki, Tampere, Oulu and Turku.

Hundreds of Muslim asylum seekers and refugees from Iraq and Afghanistan convert to Christianity after having had their first asylum application rejected by the Finnish Immigration Service (Migri), in order to re-apply for asylum on the grounds of religious persecution.

In 2018, the Minister of Justice Antti Häkkänen ruled out the use of Islamic law in Finland.

== Islamic societies ==
Table 1: Largest Islamic Societies in Finland 2009
Name	Registered	Home	Members
Finnish-Islamic Congregation	1925	Helsinki	567
Islamic Society of Finland	1987	Helsinki	1 097
Helsinki Islamic Center	1995	Helsinki	1 817
Tampere Islamic Society	1998	Tampere	837
The Islamic Rahma Center in Finland	1998	Helsinki	575
Islamic Society of Northern Finland	2000	Oulu	361
Resalat Islamilainen Yhdyskunta	2001	Vantaa	486

There are dozens of independent Islamic societies in Finland. The oldest one is Finnish-Islamic Congregation which was established in 1925. It has about 700 members of whom all are Tatars. The society has mosques in Helsinki, Tampere and Lahti. The only building established only as mosque in Finland is Järvenpää Mosque.

The Islamic Society of Finland was established in 1987. Its members are mainly Arabs, but also Finnish converts. The society has a mosque and Koran school in Helsinki. The Helsinki Islamic Center is currently the biggest society with almost 2,000 members. Furthermore, there are a dozen other Islamic societies in Helsinki region, some of them are not officially registered.

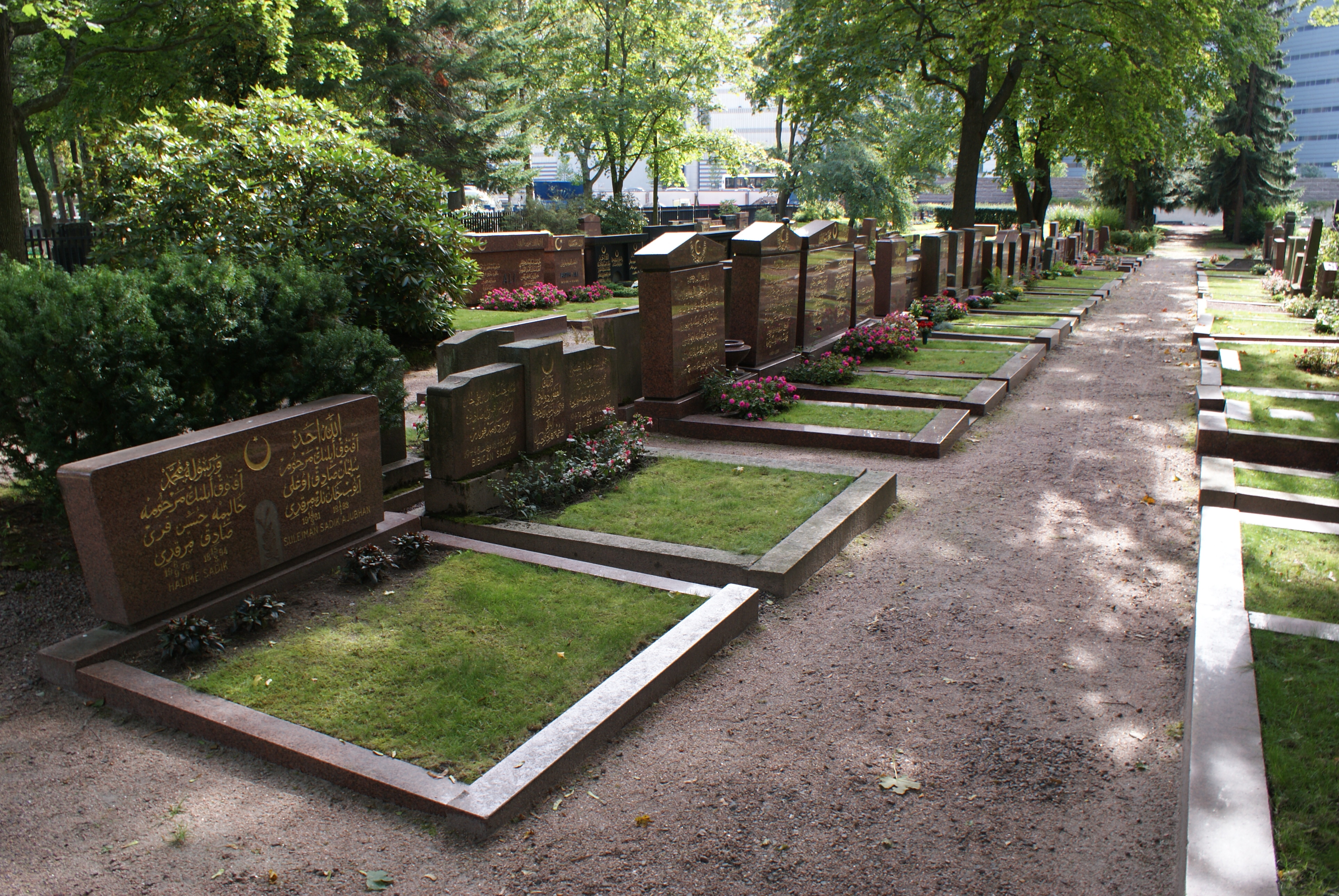
Helsinki Islamic cemetery

Most of mosques are multilingual, but the most commonly used languages are usually English and Finnish. Religious services are held in Arabic.

== Demographics ==
The population of Muslims in Finland from 2008 to 2020, according to the Statistics Finland:

Year	Population
2008	40,000
2010	45,000
2012	50,000
2014	60,237
2016	110,000
2018	136,000
2020	151,000

== Muslim majority ethnic groups by language ==
Numbers are based on the Statistics Finland (language, 2024).

- Arabic language (43,534)
- Somali language (26,891)
- Persian language (22,154)
- Albanian language (19,072)
- Kurdish language (17,953)
- Turkish language (12,964)
- Bengali language (11,588)
- Urdu language (7,950)
- Uzbek language (2,865)
- Bosnian language (2,504)
- Tigrinya language (2,327)
- Pashtu language (2,141)
- Punjabi language (2,086)
- Yoruba language (1,876)
- Indonesian language (1,060)
- Chechen language (949)
- Azerbaijani language (721)
- Turkmen language (682)
- Kyrgyz language (659)
- Uyghur language (419)
- Wolof language (417)
- Kazakh language (333)
- Hausa language (312)
- Oromo language (271)
- Tatar language (253)
- Fulani language (240)
- Tajik language (219)
- Sindhi language (217)
- Malay language (197)

Total: 182,854 (3.2%)

== Gallery ==
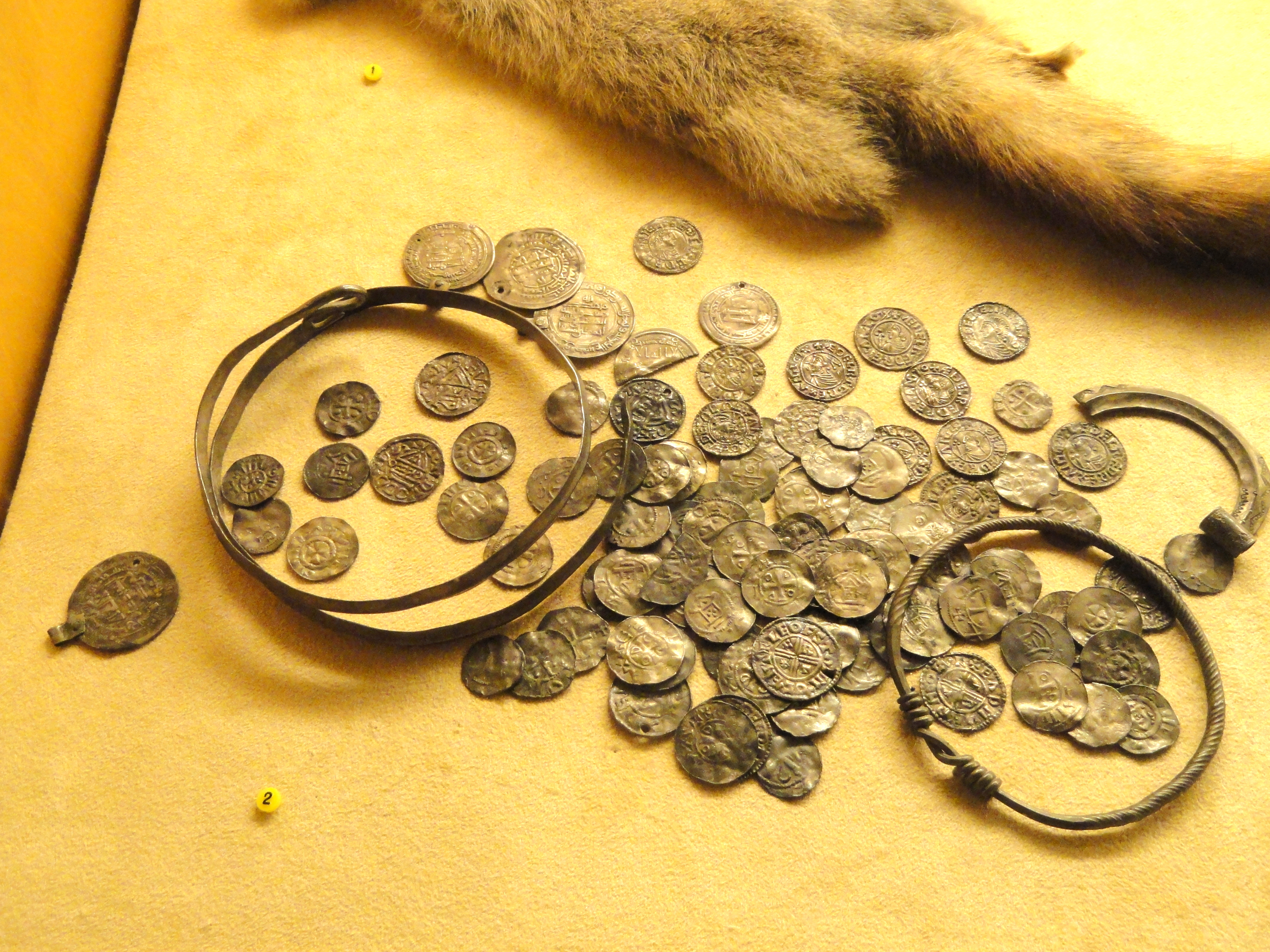
6 Islamic, 15 English, and 76 German coins, latest coin dates from 1006 to 1030 - National Museum of Finland

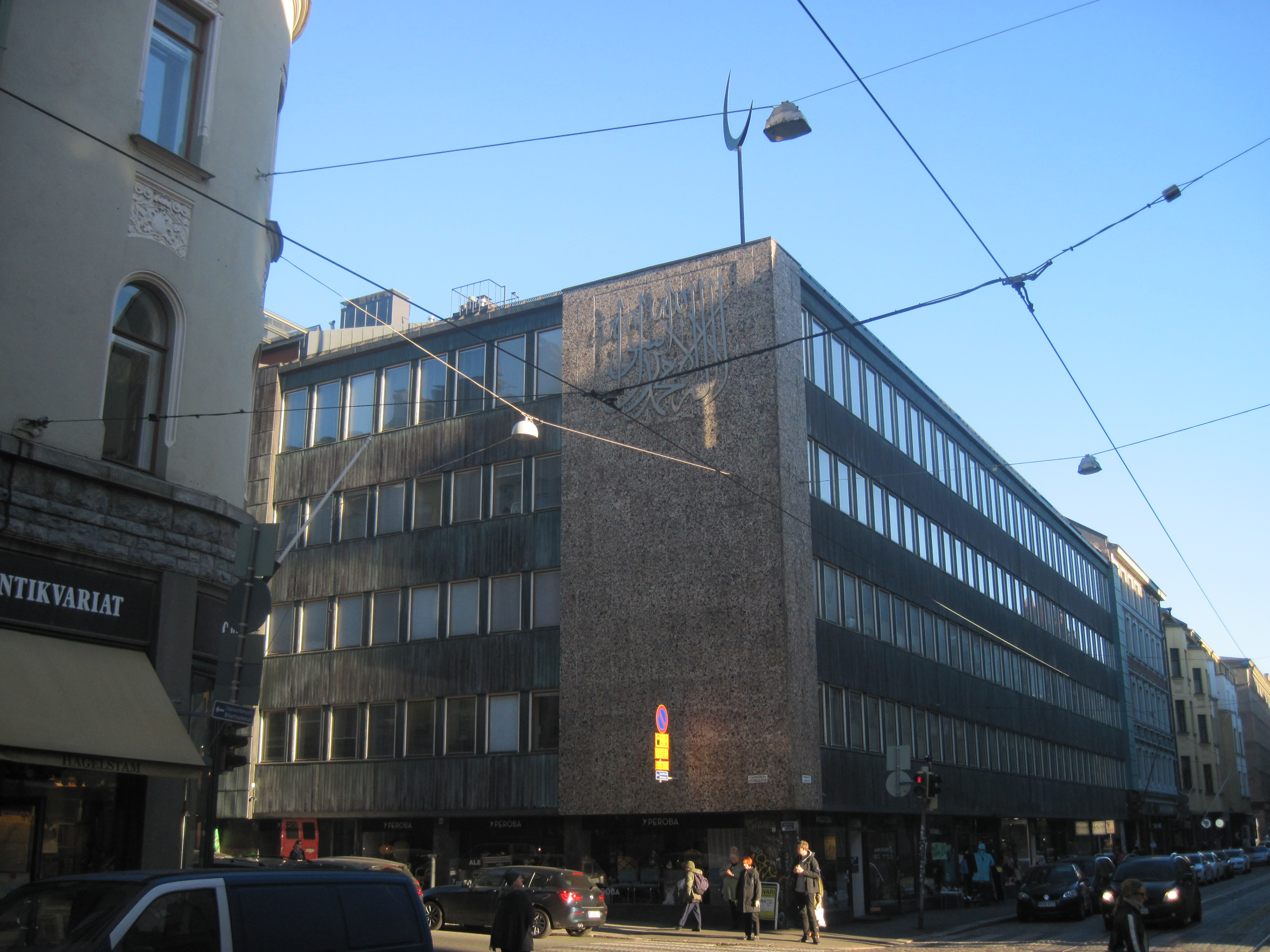
Main building of the Finnish-Islamic Congregation in Helsinki.

== See also ==
- Turks in Finland
- Finnish Islamic Party
- History of Islam in the Arctic and Subarctic regions
- Islam in Sweden
