= Viiskulma =

Road intersection in Helsinki, Finland

Coordinates: 60°9′39″N 24°56′31″E

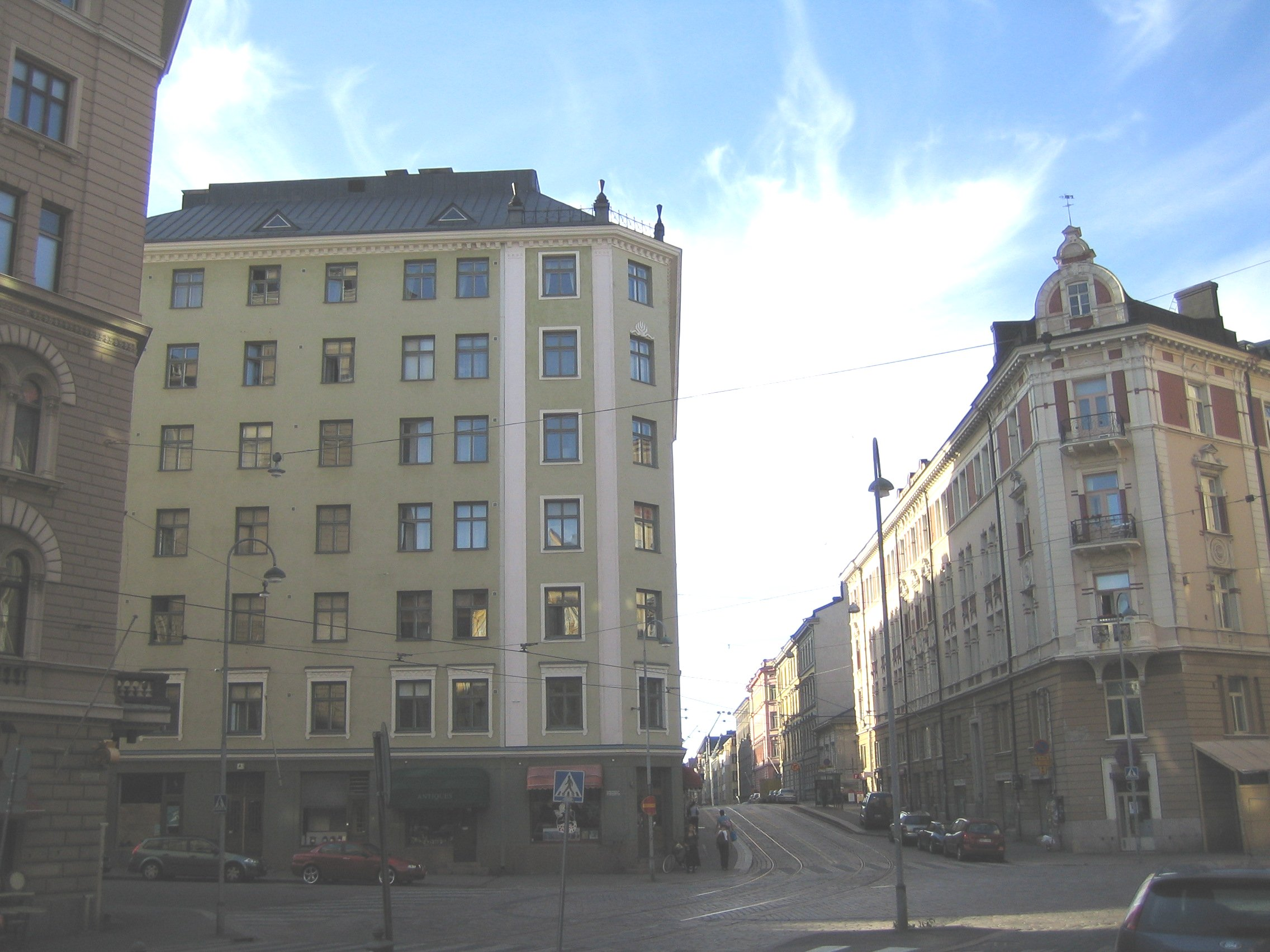
A view at Viiskulma towards Fredrikinkatu Street.

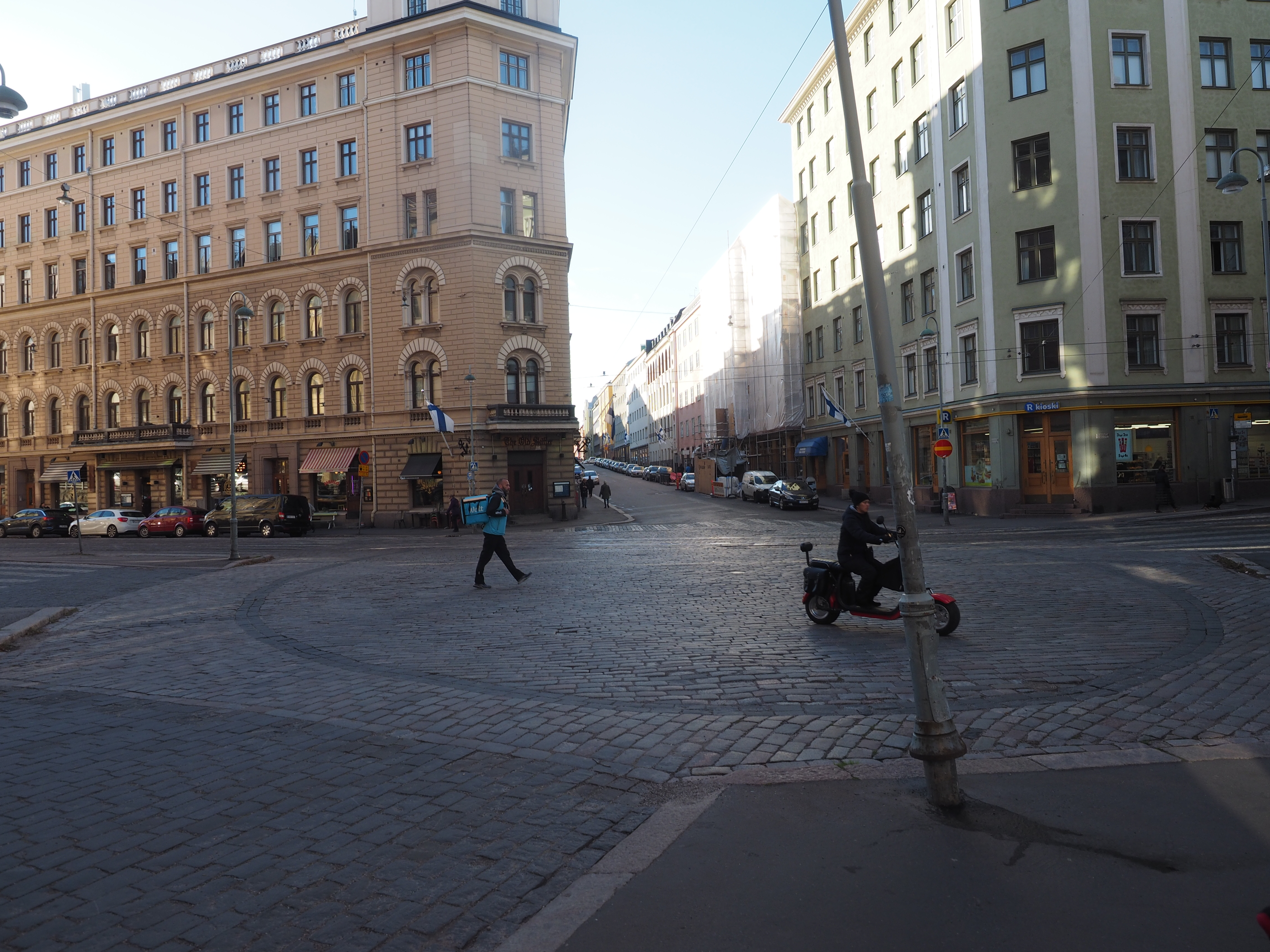
Viiskulma on an October afternoon.

Viiskulma (Finnish, literally "Five Corner"; Swedish: Femkanten, literally "Five Edge") is a well known intersection of five streets in Helsinki (Laivurinkatu, Pursimiehenkatu, Fredrikinkatu, Laivurinrinne and Tarkk'ampujankatu) at the boundary of the Punavuori and Ullanlinna neighbourhoods. The street Fredrikinkatu is one of the oldest and major traffic arteries of Helsinki's inner city.

The five buildings marking each corner of the junction are taller than the surrounding buildings, giving them a tower-like feel: they were built over a period from the late 1890s to the late 1920s and vary in architectural style from Neo-Renaissance to Nordic Classicism: Fredrikinkatu 19 (1896) by architects Nyström, Petrelius and Penttilä; Laivurinrinne 1 (1928) by architect E. Ikälainen; Tarkk'ampujankatu 20 (1927) by architect Väinö Vähäkallio; Laivurinkatu 10 (1890) by architect Selim A. Lindqvist; Fredrikinkatu 12 (1927) architect unknown.

Viiskulma has traditionally been known as a landmark, and nowadays for the several record shops in it or in its immediate vicinity, specialising in various styles of music. The most famous of these shops was Digelius Music, which operated in its location between the years 1971-2023. This rich offering is celebrated by Egotrippi in Polkupyörälaulu (2001).

There are several buildings in or near Viiskulma which are important from the point of view of local cultural history. The ground floor of the building at Laivurinrinne 1 was originally the Merano cinema theatre; the ground floor of the building at Tarkk'ampujankatu 20 was originally a bank; the ground floor of the building at Laivurinkatu 10 has been since it was first built in the use of the Primula bakery and restaurant.
