= Järvenpää Mosque =

Mosque in Järvenpää, Uusimaa, Finland

- Järvenpään moskeija
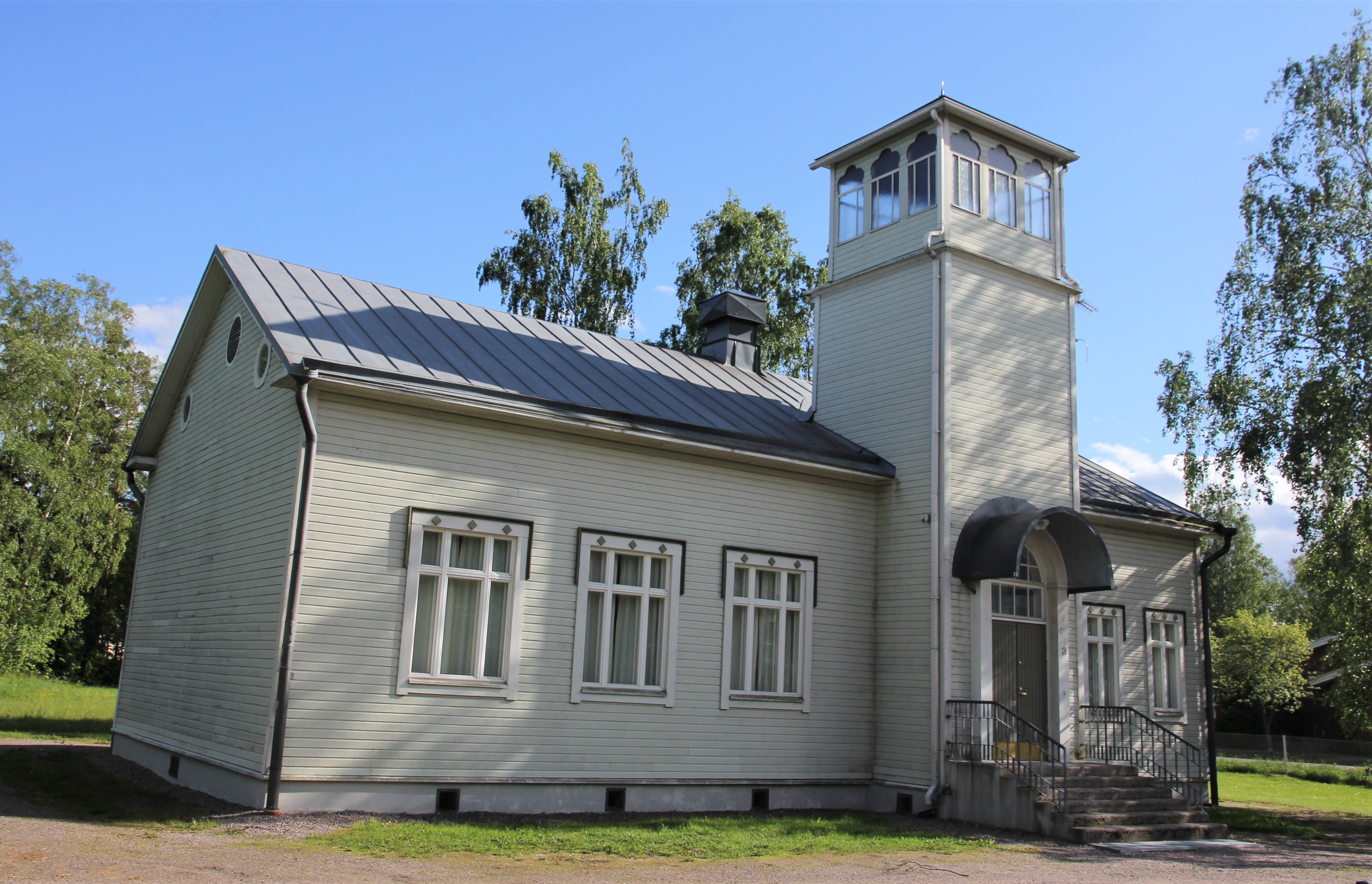

- Location of the mosque in Finland

Religion
- Affiliation: Sunni Islam
- Ecclesiastical or organizational status: Mosque
- Ownership: The Finnish-Islamic Congregation
- Status: Active

Location
- Location: Kinnari, Järvenpää, Uusimaa
- Country: Finland
- Interactive map of Järvenpää Mosque
- Coordinates: 60°28′22″N 25°06′04″E

Architecture
- Type: Mosque
- Established: 1942

The Järvenpää Mosque (Finnish: Järvenpään moskeija) is a Sunni Islam mosque located in the town of Järvenpää, in Finland. Funded by the Finnish Tatar community, the mosque was built in the 1940s and it is owned by The Finnish-Islamic Congregation.

== Overview ==
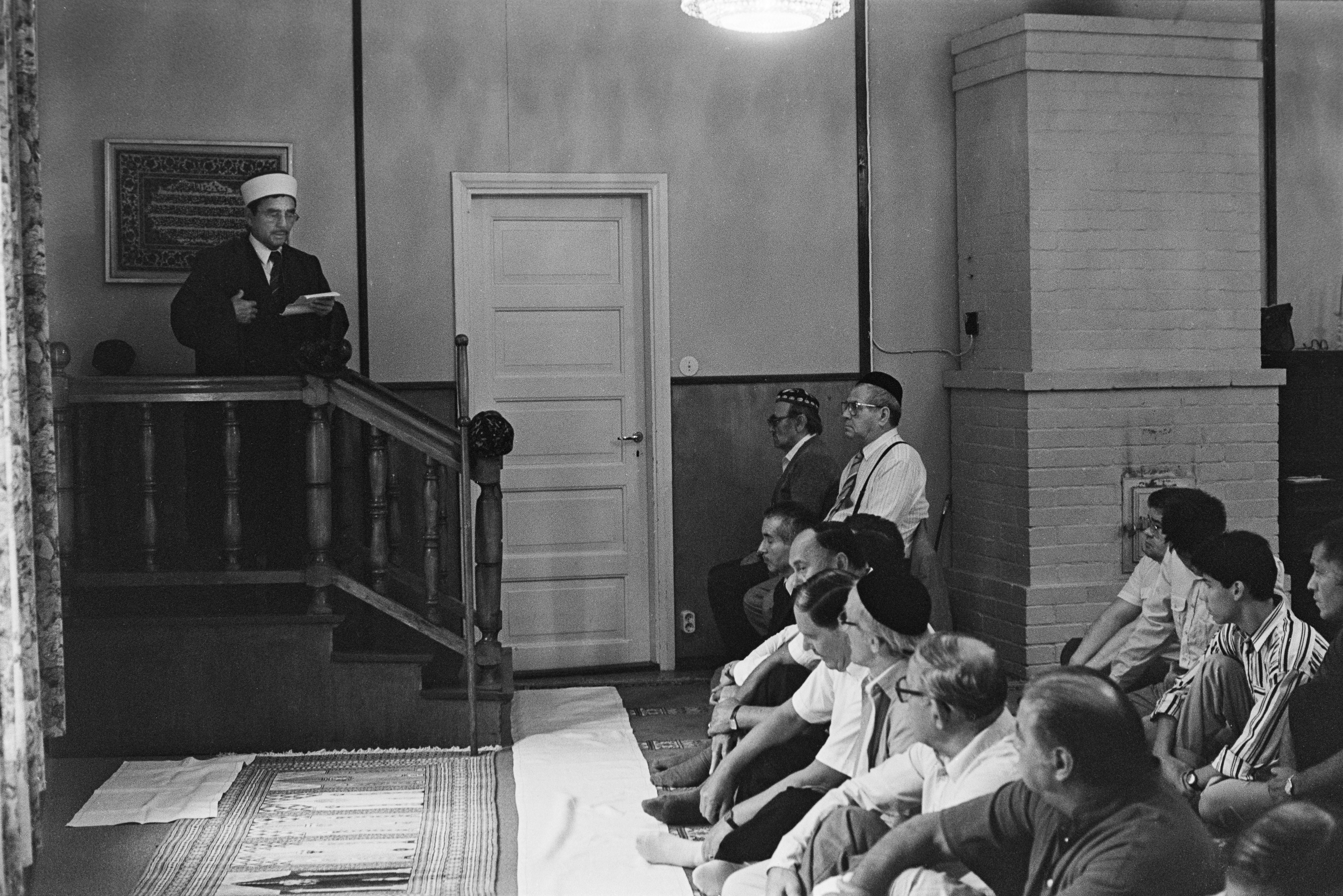
Imam Enver Yıldırım and Finnish Tatars in 1989

In the 1980s in the mosque, Tatars still arranged language and religious teaching for the children of the community. Later, most of the activity has been centered around a few religious occasions, such as Ramadan.

Around the time the Järvenpää Mosque was built, a separate Islamic congregation was founded in Tampere by local Tatars.

== See also ==
- Islam in Finland
- Tatars
