= Helsinki Islamic Center =

Islamic Center in Helsinki, Finland

- Finnish: Helsinki Islam Keskus
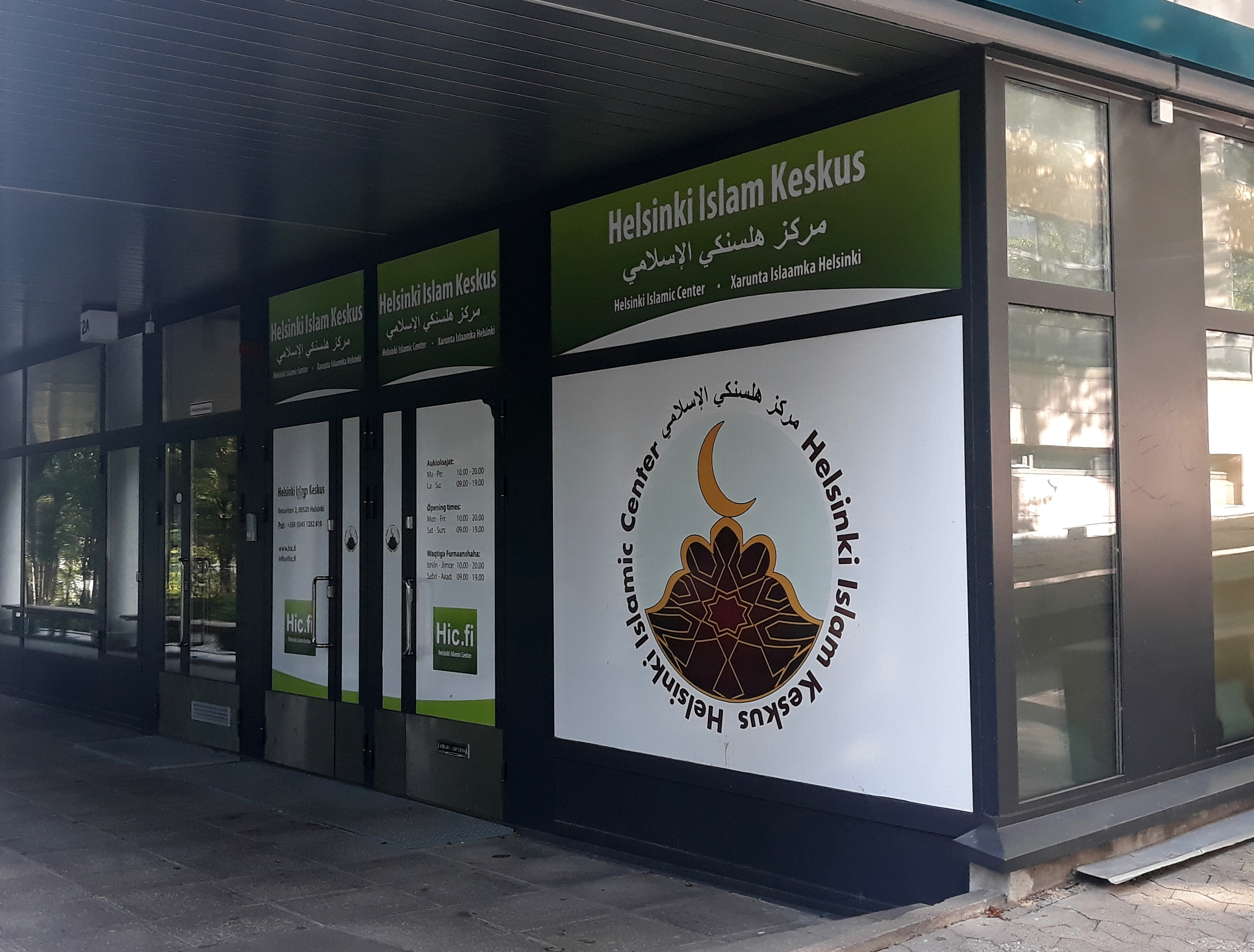
- Helsinki Islamic Center Mosque in Pasila

Religion
- Affiliation: Islam

Location
- Municipality: Helsinki
- Country: Finland
- Interactive map of Helsinki Islamic Center
- Coordinates: 60.199712°N 24.937189°E

Architecture
- Type: Mosque
- Established: 1995

Website
- hic.fi

The Helsinki Islamic Center (Finnish: Helsinki Islam Keskus) is one of the largest Islamic Centers in Finland, with over 3,000 members. The center has tree floors and an area of over 2,700 square metres (29,000 sq ft). It was founded in 1995, but moved several times while renting, until it moved into the current location in 2002. It is located in Itä-Pasila, a neighborhood of the Pasila subdivision, and aims to serve the greater Muslim community of Helsinki. The founders were Somalis, who separated from the Islamic community of Finland. The majority of the members are now Somalis, Arabs and West Africans.

In 2025 the center was awarded €23,794 by the Ministry of Education and Culture of Finland in their general grant for assisting the activities of registered religious communities.

== Facilities ==
The center hosts a wide array of facilities, providing areas for worship and social activities. It includes a library, halal food market, and a small cafe. It has an academy for teaching Arabic, Islam, and history. The center provides facilities for preparing the dead, including washing, wrapping, blessing, and short term storage. It offers Islamic marriage ceremonies, as well as conflict resolution and mediation with imams. It also can provide translation assistance with the Kela, as well as filling out paperwork like job applications.

== See also ==
- Islam in Finland
