= Fredrikinkatu =

Street in Helsinki, Finland

Coordinates: 60°10′01″N 024°56′00″E

Fredrikinkatu Fredriksgatan
- Freda
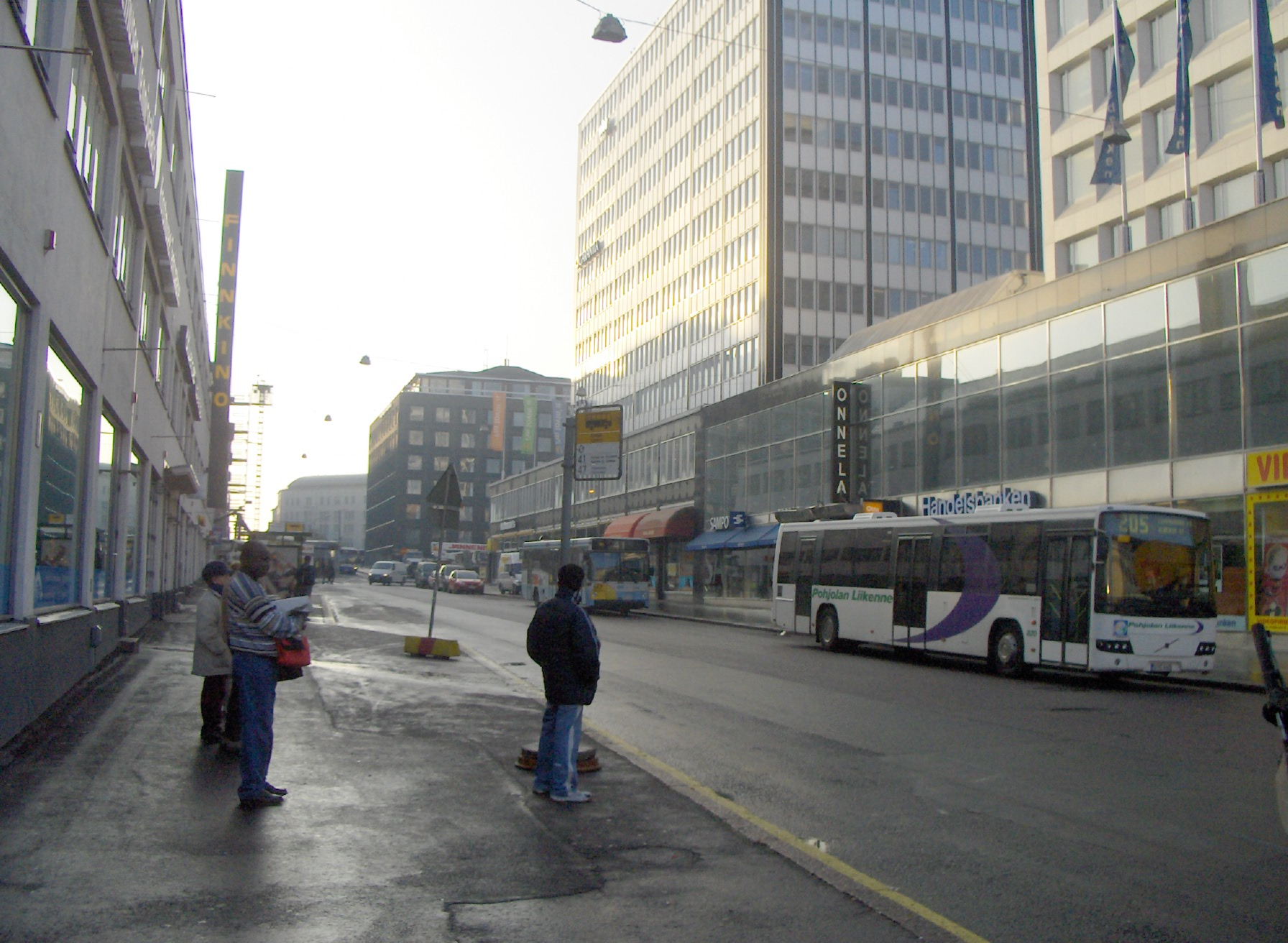
- Interactive map of Fredrikinkatu; Fredriksgatan
- Owner: City of Helsinki
- Location: Helsinki, Finland
- Postal code: 00100, 00120

Other
- Status: In use

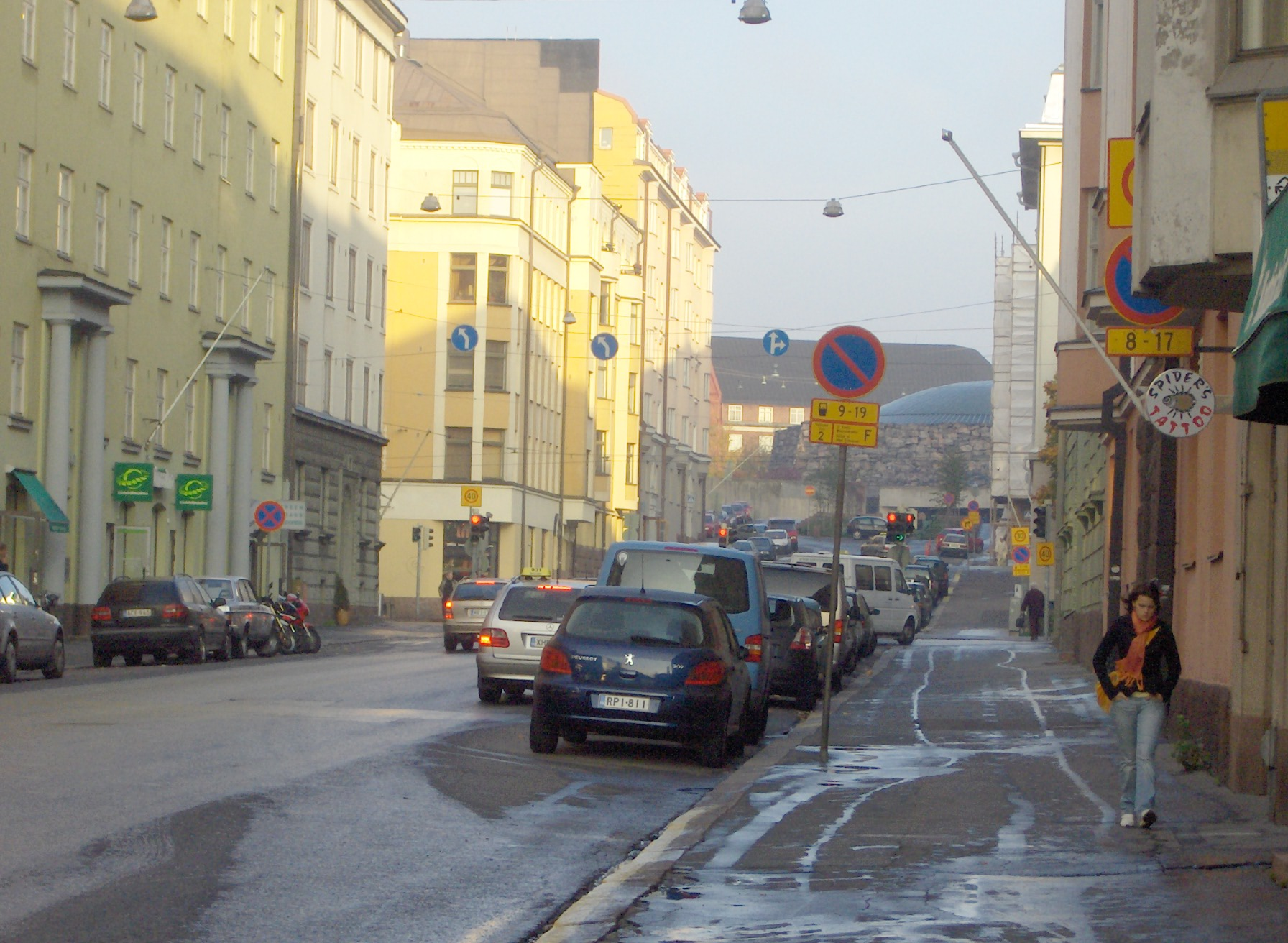
Fredrikinkatu with Temppeliaukio Church visible in the background

Fredrikinkatu (Swedish: Fredriksgatan, Helsinki slang: Freda, "Fredrik's street") is a street in Helsinki, Finland that starts from Viiskulma in the district of Punavuori and continues north by the western side of Kamppi Center until it reaches Lutherinkatu and the Temppeliaukio Church in Etu-Töölö.

Fredrikinkatu is mostly a northbound one-way street. Helsinki tram lines 1 and 3 run on Fredrikinkatu in both directions between Viiskulma and Bulevardi. There's a disused section of tram track between Urho Kekkosen katu and Arkadiankatu.

== Major buildings ==
- Fredrikinkatu 21 (Ratakatu 12): the headquarters of the Finnish Security Intelligence Service, designed by E. Sihvola in 1888.
- Fredrikinkatu 42: The Luther Church, designed by K. A. Wrede in 1894.
- Fredrikinkatu 44: Sähkötalo, designed by Alvar Aalto. Sähkötalo is located across Fredrikinkatu from Kamppi Center.
- Fredrikinkatu 65: Tennispalatsi.

The majority of the buildings along Fredrikinkatu are full of small shops and boutiques, especially in the area between Iso Roobertinkatu and Eerikinkatu.

== Intersecting streets ==
- Merimiehenkatu
- Punavuorenkatu (to the left) / Ratakatu (to the right), Fredrikintori Square is in the intersection
- Iso Roobertinkatu, a pedestrian-only street east of Fredrikinkatu
- Uudenmaankatu
- Bulevardi
- Lönnrotinkatu
- Kalevankatu
- Eerikinkatu
- Malminkatu (to the left) / Kansakoulukatu (to the right)
- Malminrinne (to the left) / Urho Kekkosen katu (to the right), open only to public transportation
  - The triangular-shaped area between Fredrikinkatu, Malminkatu and Malminrinne is a square called Kampintori
- Kampinkuja (to the left), a small promenade
- Salomonkatu, a promenade east of Fredrikinkatu
- Eteläinen Rautatienkatu
  - Baana, a bicycling super highway, runs perpendicular to Fredrikinkatu, under street level
- Pohjoinen Rautatienkatu
- Arkadiankatu
- Dagmarinkatu (to the right)
