= Luther Church, Helsinki =

Luther Church
- Finnish: Luther-kirkko; Swedish: Luther-kyrkan
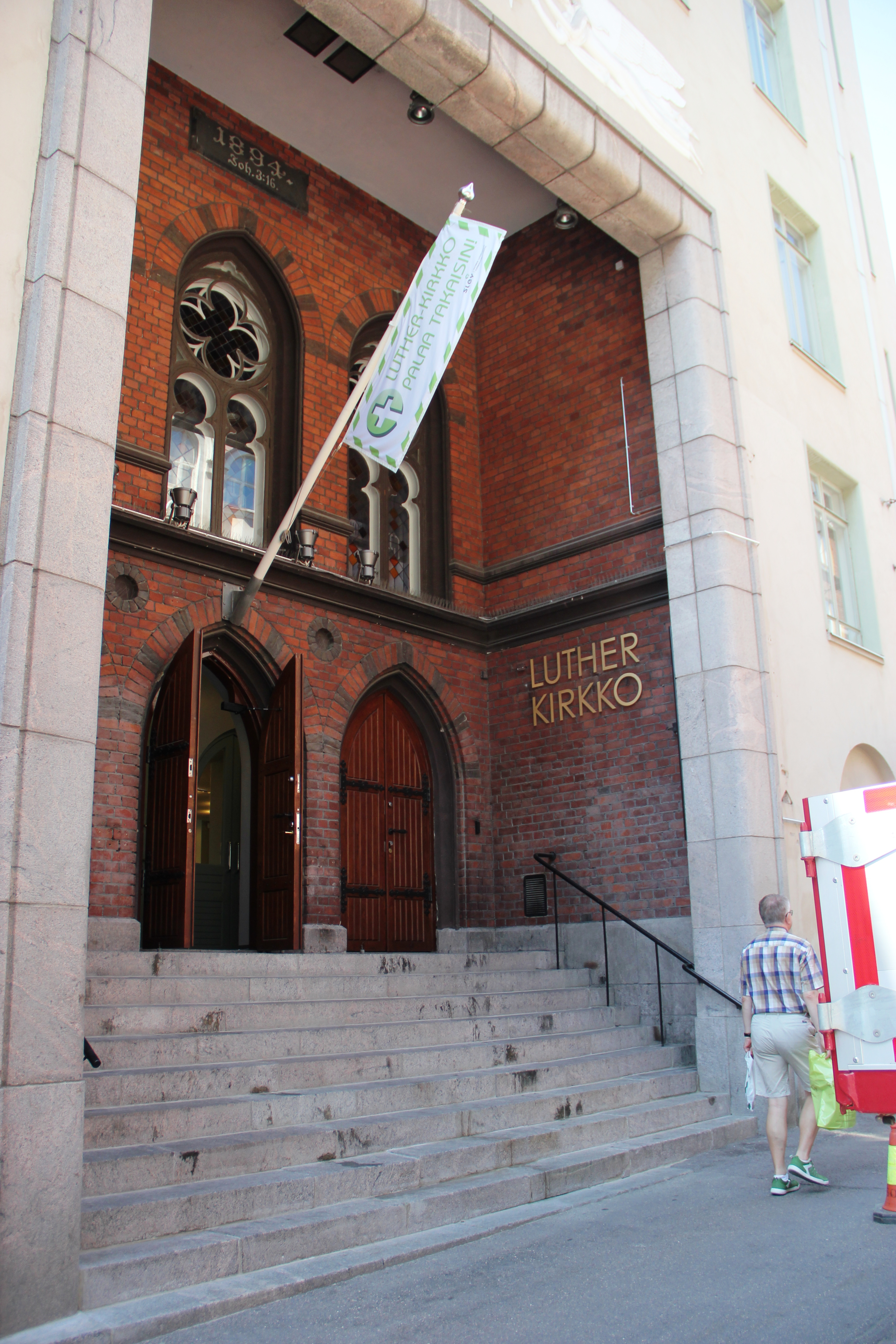
- Luther Church
- 60°10′00.7″N 24°55′58.2″E
- Location: Kamppi, Helsinki
- Address: Fredrikinkatu 42
- Country: Finland
- Denomination: Lutheran
- Website: lutherkirkko.fi

Architecture
- Architect: Karl August Wrede
- Style: Functionalism
- Completed: 1894; 132 years ago

Specifications
- Capacity: c. 600

Administration
- Parish: Lutheran Evangelical Association of Finland

The Luther Church (Finnish: Luther-kirkko, Swedish: Luther-kyrkan), designed by Karl August Wrede and completed in 1894, is a Lutheran church in Helsinki. It is maintained by the Lutheran Evangelical Association of Finland (LEAF), who has leased the property from its current owner, Varma Mutual Pension Insurance Company.

Originally, on the adjacent lot at Malminkatu 12, there was LEAF's prayer room designed by Theodor Höijer, which was completed in 1878. As the congregation expanded, a new prayer room was built next to it on the Fredrikinkatu side in 1894, designed by Karl August Wrede in the Gothic style, and it has been expanded several times. Alterations were made according to Hilding Ekelund's plans in 1931, when the building got its current functionalist facade, and it was consecrated as a church. During the Winter War bombings in 1939, the church was badly damaged, but it was restored to its former appearance.

In May 2016, the building returned to church use after twenty years as a nightclub. Nowadays, the church is in active use, and in addition to worship services both in English and Finnish, activities for different age and target groups and concerts are organized there. The church is especially popular with young people, students and families with children.
