= Amos Rex =

Art museum in Helsinki, Finland

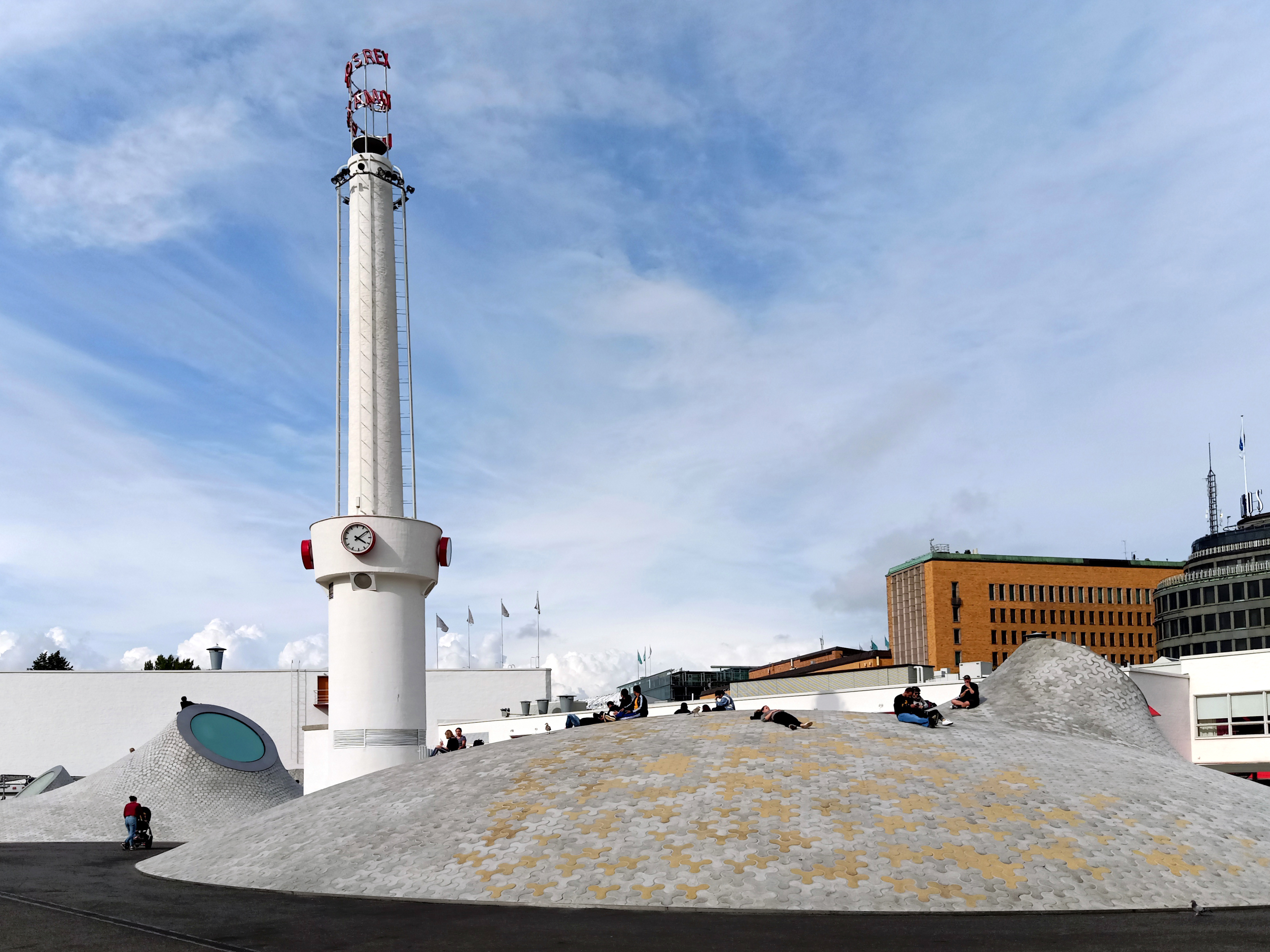
- The museum emerges like bubbles from the underground
- Established: 30 August 2018
- Location: Lasipalatsi, Helsinki, Finland
- Type: Art Museum
- Directors: Kai Kartio (2018–2024), Kieran Long (2024–)
- Website: amosrex.fi/en/

Amos Rex is an independent, privately funded contemporary art museum named after the publisher and arts patron Amos Anderson and located in Lasipalatsi, on Mannerheimintie boulevard in Helsinki, Finland. It opened in 2018 and rapidly reached international popularity, attracting more than 10,000 visitors in a matter of weeks. It attracts about 250,000 visitors annually. The museum presents a dynamic programme of contemporary art, media art, and experimental installations.

The museum's first director was Kai Kartio, who led Amos Rex through its early years. In February 2024, Kieran Long was appointed the museum’s director and CEO.

== History ==
An immersive experience in the Massless exhibition by teamLab.

Amos Rex traces its origins to Föreningen Konstsamfundet, an association founded in 1940 by Amos Anderson. Following Anderson’s passing in 1961, Konstsamfundet carried forward his vision of supporting the arts, founding the Amos Anderson Art Museum (1965–2017) in his former home and offices at Yrjönkatu 27 in Helsinki in 1965. The museum closed on 3 September 2017, and reopened as Amos Rex in its new location beneath Lasipalatsi Square in 2018. To honour both Anderson’s will and his legacy of supporting the arts, Konstsamfundet opened Amos Andersons Hem at the site of the Amos Anderson Art Museum in 2023. Konstsamfundet’s main purposes are to support arts and different fields of culture for the Swedish speaking Finns in the Finnish society.

The Amos Anderson Art Museum, established as a continuation of Amos Anderson’s legacy, played a significant role in promoting contemporary art in Finland. During the 1960s and 1970s, it was one of only two major museums dedicated primarily to contemporary art, alongside the Tampere Art Museum. Its collections and exhibitions reflected a commitment to supporting both Finnish and international artists, laying the groundwork for what would later evolve into Amos Rex.

By the early 2010s, the Amos Anderson Art Museum faced spatial limitations that restricted its ability to showcase large-scale contemporary art. In response, Konstsamfundet initiated plans to create a new, expanded museum. The transition from the Amos Anderson Art Museum to Amos Rex aimed to provide modern exhibition spaces while preserving Anderson’s legacy.

In 2013, the museum announced plans to build a subterranean annex under the Lasipalatsi plaza, located near the museum's premises on Yrjönkatu. The annex was estimated to cost 50 million euros and to also use facilities above the ground in the Lasipalatsi building. The Helsinki City Board decided to reserve the plot for the museum in December 2013. The funding was provided by the Finnish-Swedish arts foundation Konstsamfundet. The museum plan was unanimously approved by the Helsinki City Council in May 2014 and the new annex was scheduled to open in 2017.

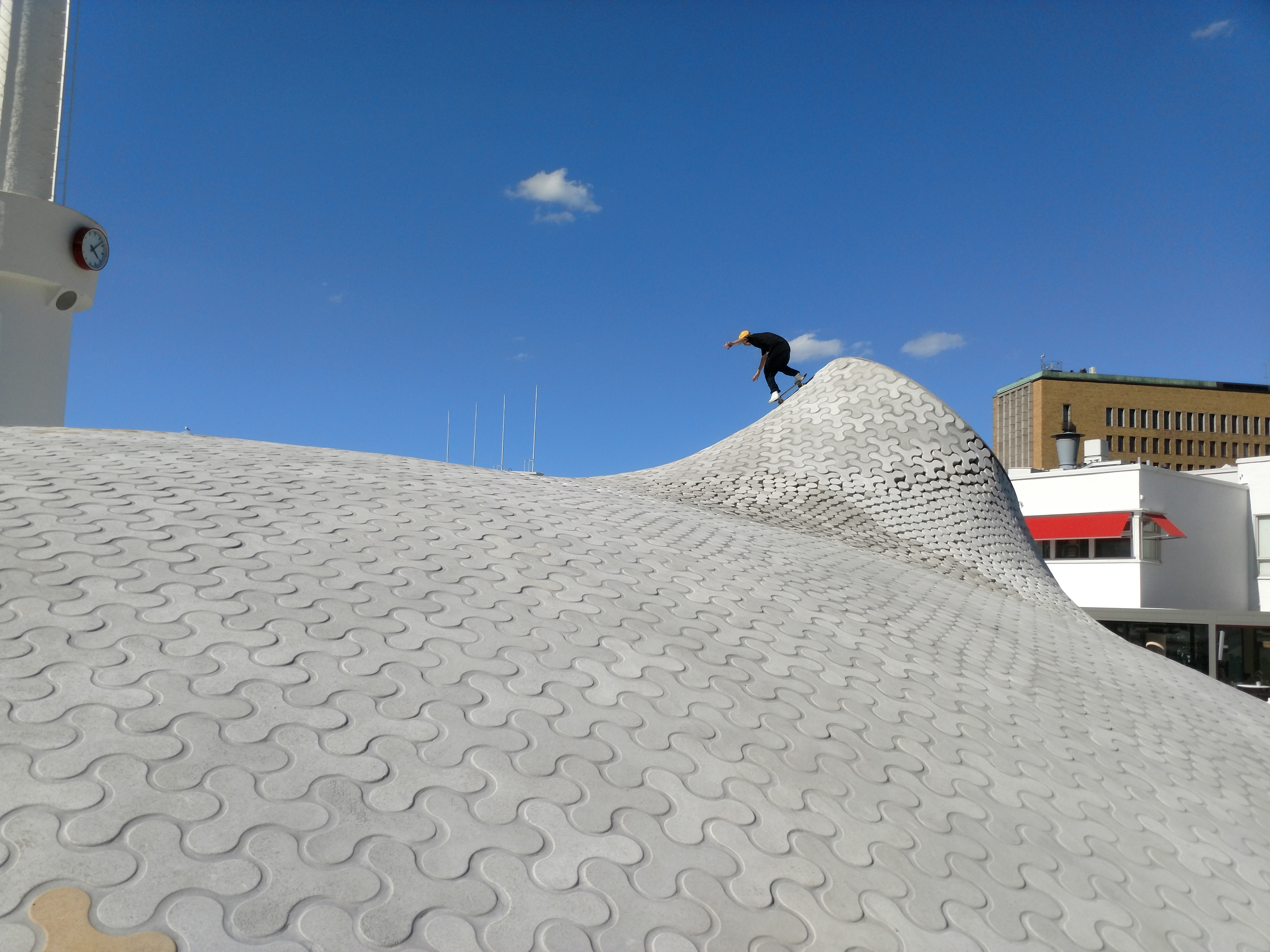
Amos Rex's bubble roof's are popular among skateboarders.

The name Amos Rex was chosen to meet three key requirements: it had to reference Amos Anderson, connect to Lasipalatsi, and be short enough to require no translation. A fourth, more light-hearted criterion was that Anderson himself would approve of it from above.

== Architecture and design ==
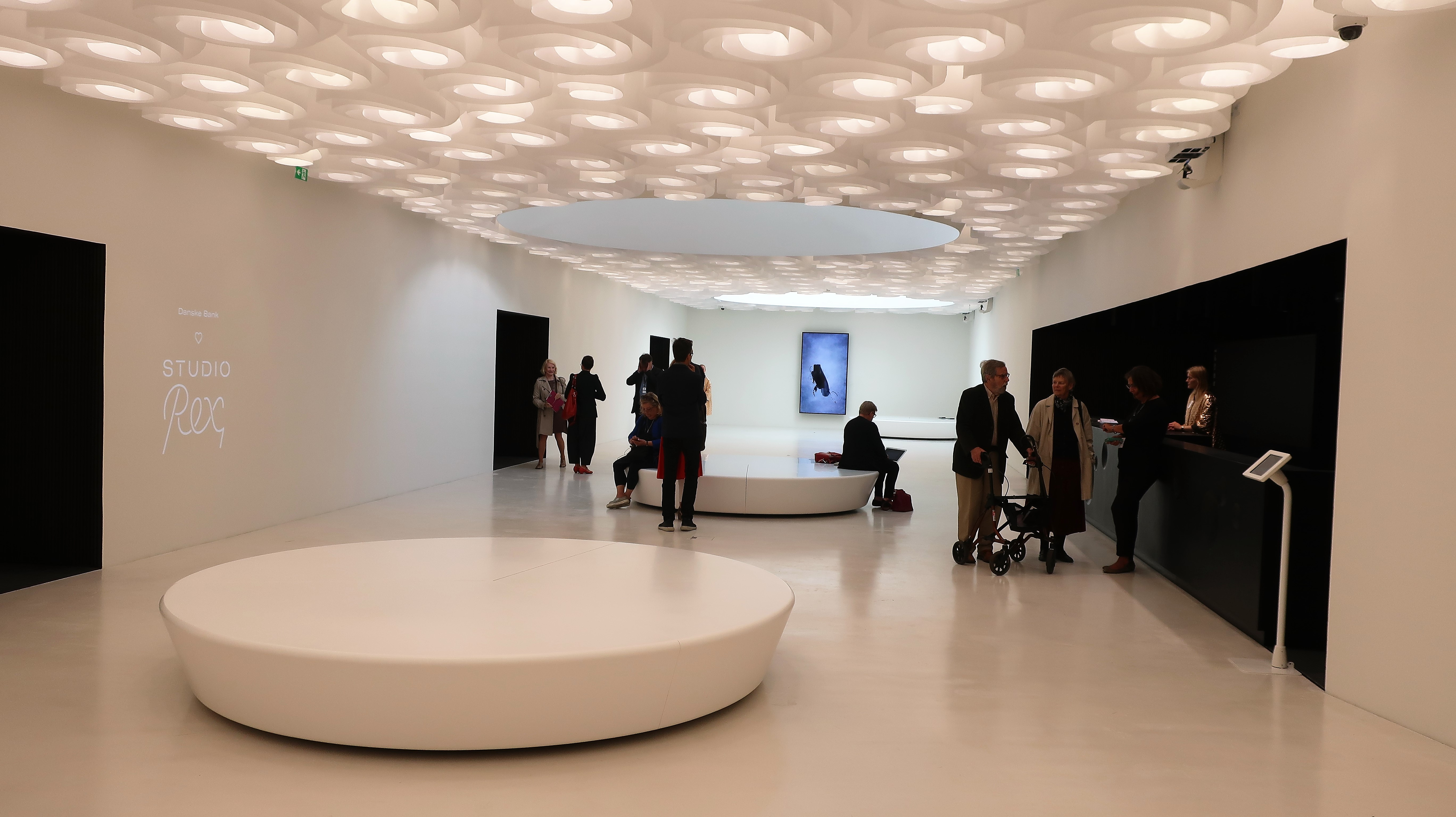
The lobby.

The design of the new Amos Rex was conceptualised by JKMM Architects, whose other works include the Turku Main Library and the Finnish pavilion at the 2010 Shanghai World Expo. The goal was to create a space that blends modernity and heritage, with the new museum integrated beneath Lasipalatsi Square while respecting the historical significance of the Lasipalatsi building. The underground exhibition spaces, combined with the museum's innovative design, preserve the connection to the city’s architectural heritage while providing a flexible, modern space for contemporary art.

A key feature of the museum’s design is its interactive rooftop domes, which serve as both artistic elements and functional skylights, allowing natural light to filter into the underground spaces. These domes contribute to the museum’s public and accessible nature, with an emphasis on open, low-threshold spaces that engage both locals and visitors. Asmo Jaaksi, chief architect of the museum, said that it was important that some kind of contact between the ground level and the subterranean world was created. The roof construction was completed in cooperation with specialists from Sweco Structures.

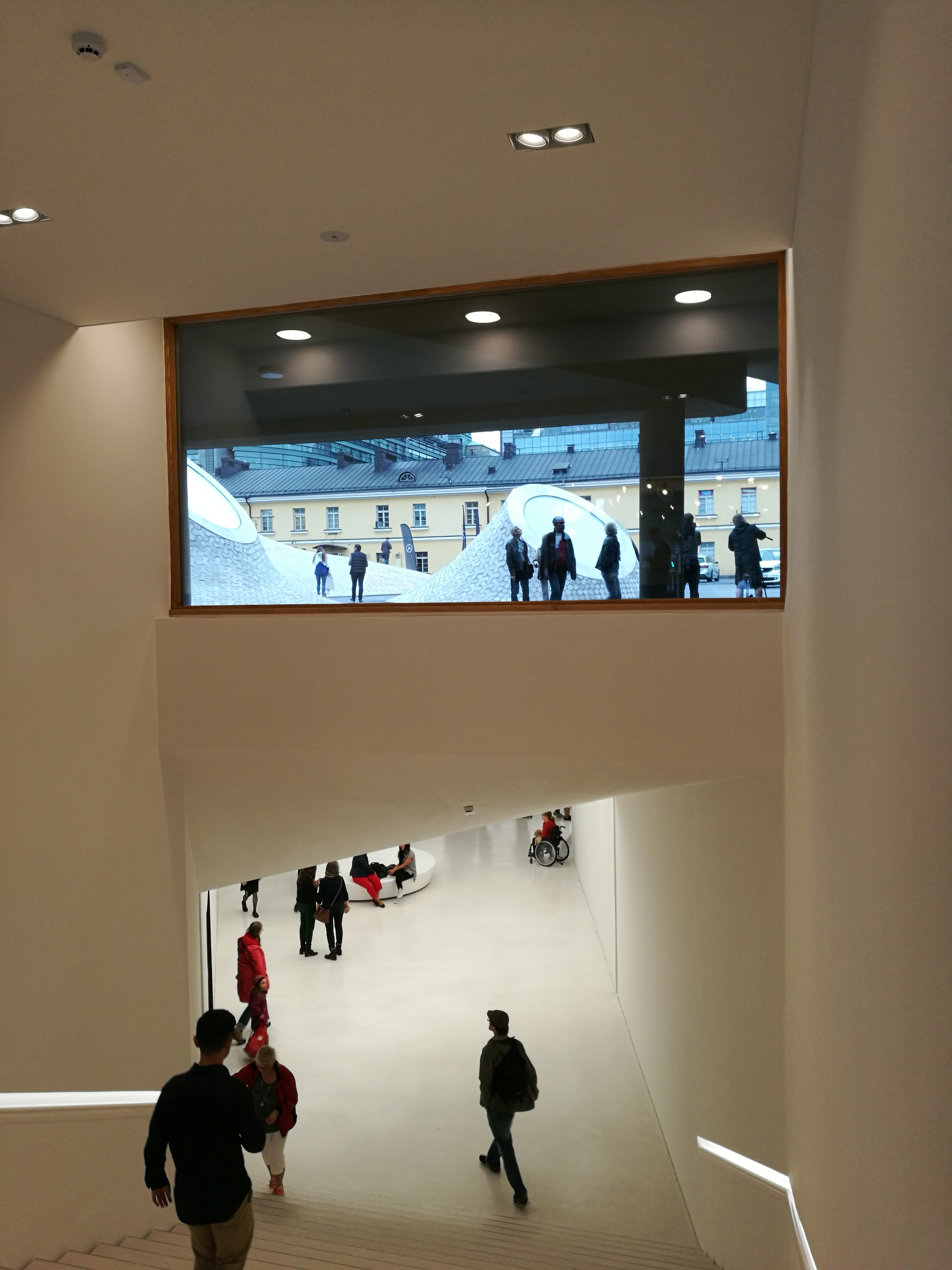
Stairs.

As The New York Times writes, the museum “appears to physically resist its placement in a vast underground space, [as] it is topped by five conical domes that bubble up from the surface of the Lasipalatsi Square in downtown Helsinki like inverted craters of an alien moonscape.” The design prioritises an urban connection, offering a welcoming environment for all to engage with contemporary art in a dynamic setting.

Inside, the exhibition room is defined by its distinctive ceiling discs, which conceal technical elements while also serving aesthetic and acoustic functions. KONE designed the elevators to accommodate the museum’s evolving exhibitions and events, ensuring they serve multiple uses and users. The elevators are highly adaptable, featuring programmable lights and animations on their walls, along with integrated speakers that enhance the experience with an auditory element.

The Finnish brand agency Werklig developed the visual identity for Amos Rex, drawing inspiration from both its historic and contemporary architecture. The logotype reflects the 1930s neon signs of the Lasipalatsi building, while the dynamic animation concept echoes the museum’s distinctive rooftop domes.

The construction of the new museum started in January 2016 and it opened to the public in August 2018.

The museum’s commitment to public art is reflected in installations such as Oasis and Nest, and future projects continue to expand its public role. The summer 2025 programme features an installation by the British artist Yinka Ilori, adding to the museum’s evolving contribution to public cultural life.

== Exhibitions ==
Massless, the first exhibition at the Amos Rex museum, was created by the Japanese collective teamLab. It consisted of a colourful, immersive interactive art exhibition. Viewers were encouraged to interact and explore with the surroundings, generating different visual results. Amos Rex holds approximately 3–4 exhibitions a year.

Exhibitions
Dates	Title	Artist(s)	Exhibition Description
August 30, 2018 – January 6, 2019	Massless	teamLab	An interactive, immersive exhibition by the Japanese 500-member art collective teamLab, where interactive videos were projected onto the walls.
February 8, 2019 – May 19, 2019	Life Line	René Magritte	The exhibition presented the works of the renowned Surrealist René Magritte for the first time in Finland.
March 3, 2019 – May 19, 2019	Studio Drift	Lonneke Gordijn and Ralph Nauta	The exhibition featured works by Studio Drift, with the most notable piece being Drifter, a floating concrete cube.
June 19, 2018 – September 8, 2019	Ars Fennica 2019	Petri Ala-Maunus, Miriam Bäckström, Ragnar Kjartansson, Aurora Reinhard, and Egill Sæbjörnsson	The exhibition showcased works by the five finalists of the Ars Fennica Prize.
October 10, 2019 – January 12, 2020	Birger Carlstedt	Birger Carlstedt	The exhibition presented the life’s work of Carlstedt, including a reconstructed café designed by the artist, which was operational.
February 12, 2020 – August 23, 2020	Generation 2020	Group exhibition, 80 young artists	A triennial exhibition held every three years showcasing works by artists aged 15–23.
October 9, 2020 – March 21, 2021	Egypt of Glory	Ancient artifacts from Egypt, dating back up to 6000 years.	The exhibition highlighted Egyptian culture, featuring mummies and created in collaboration with the Italian Museo Egizio.
May 12, 2021 – August 22, 2021	Raija Malka & Kaija Saariaho: Blick	Raija Malka & Kaija Saariaho	
May 12, 2021 – September 5, 2021	Studio Exhibition: Between us	Karoliina Hellberg, Tero Kuitunen, and Raimo Saarinen	
September 22, 2021 – February 27, 2022	Bill Viola: Inner Journey	Bill Viola	
April 2, 2022 – August 21, 2022	The Subterranean	Group exhibition, 62 international artists	
May 7, 2022 – September 4, 2022	Tadashi Kawamata: The Nest	Tadashi Kawamata	
September 21, 2022 – February 26, 2023	Hans Op de Beeck: The Quiet Parade	Hans Op de Beeck	
March 29, 2023 – August 20, 2023	Generation 2023	Group exhibition	A triennial exhibition showcasing works by artists aged 15–23.
September 27, 2023 – February 25, 2024	Ryoji Ikeda	Ryoji Ikeda	
March 27, 2024 – September 8, 2024	I feel, for now - Collection Exhibition	Various artists	
March 27, 2024 – September 8, 2024	Josefina Nelimarkka: The Cloud of Un/knowing	Josefina Nelimarkka	
April 29, 2024 – October 20, 2024	Kim Simonsson: Moss Giants	Kim Simonsson	
October 9, 2024 – March 2, 2025	Larissa Sansour	Larissa Sansour	
April 2, 2025 – August 31, 2025	Anna Estarriola: Staged Circumstances and Piles of Things	Anna Estarriola	
April 2, 2025 – August 31, 2025	Enni-Kukka Tuomala: Expanding Empathies	Enni-Kukka Tuomala	
October 8, 2025 – March 29, 2026	Leandro Erlich	Leandro Erlich	

== Collections ==
Amos Rex manages that of Konstsamfundet’s collection, which primarily focuses on 20th century art. Some works originally belonged to Amos Anderson’s personal holdings. Notable pieces include paintings by the following:

- Francesco Bassano (The adoration of the shepherds)
- Paul Signac
- Louis Valtat
- Roger Fry
- Alfred William Finch (Park in Fiesole)
- Ragnar Ekelund
- Magnus Enckell
- Eero Nelimarkka
- Tyko Sallinen
- Gustaf Wilhelm Palm

In 2021, a German painting from the collections of Amos Rex was donated back to the city of Neubrandenburg. The 17th-century oil painting by Philipp Peter Roos was part of the Amos Anderson art collection. The painting may have been stolen from the Neubrandenburg Museum in 1919, after which Amos Anderson likely acquired it during a trip to Germany in the 1920s. Its origin remains uncertain, as the museum’s archives were destroyed in World War II, and Anderson may have purchased it in good faith, unaware of its possible theft.

== Funding and governance ==
Föreningen Konstsamfundet, founded in 1940 by Amos Anderson, plays a pivotal role in the financial and strategic support of Amos Rex. As the sole beneficiary of Anderson's will, the association oversees the museum's operations and is dedicated to supporting arts and culture, particularly for Finland's Swedish-speaking minority, through grants for fine arts, publications, music, and theatre. This backing ensures Amos Rex remains a vital institution for contemporary art in Finland.

== Attendance ==
In 2024, Amos Rex ranked among Finland’s top ten most visited museums, attracting 228,303 visitors.

== Museum experience ==
Amos Rex offers a variety of pricing options for its visitors, with general admission priced at €22 for adults at the ticket office (€20 online) and €5 for students, the unemployed and everyone under 30 years old. Admission for children aged 7¬–17 is free, as well as on specific days such as Helsinki Day (June 12) and Night of the Arts (usually in mid-August), and during other initiatives that promote community engagement with the museum’s contemporary art programmes.

The entrance to Amos Rex is located within Lasipalatsi, the iconic Glass Palace built in 1936 in a functionalistic style, characterised by rows of high windows. Designed by architects Viljo Revell, Heimo Riihimäki and Niilo Kokko, this historical building, which houses restaurants, shops, and the modernised Bio Rex Cinema, creates a seamless connection between the museum and the vibrant urban landscape of Helsinki.

== Awards and recognition ==
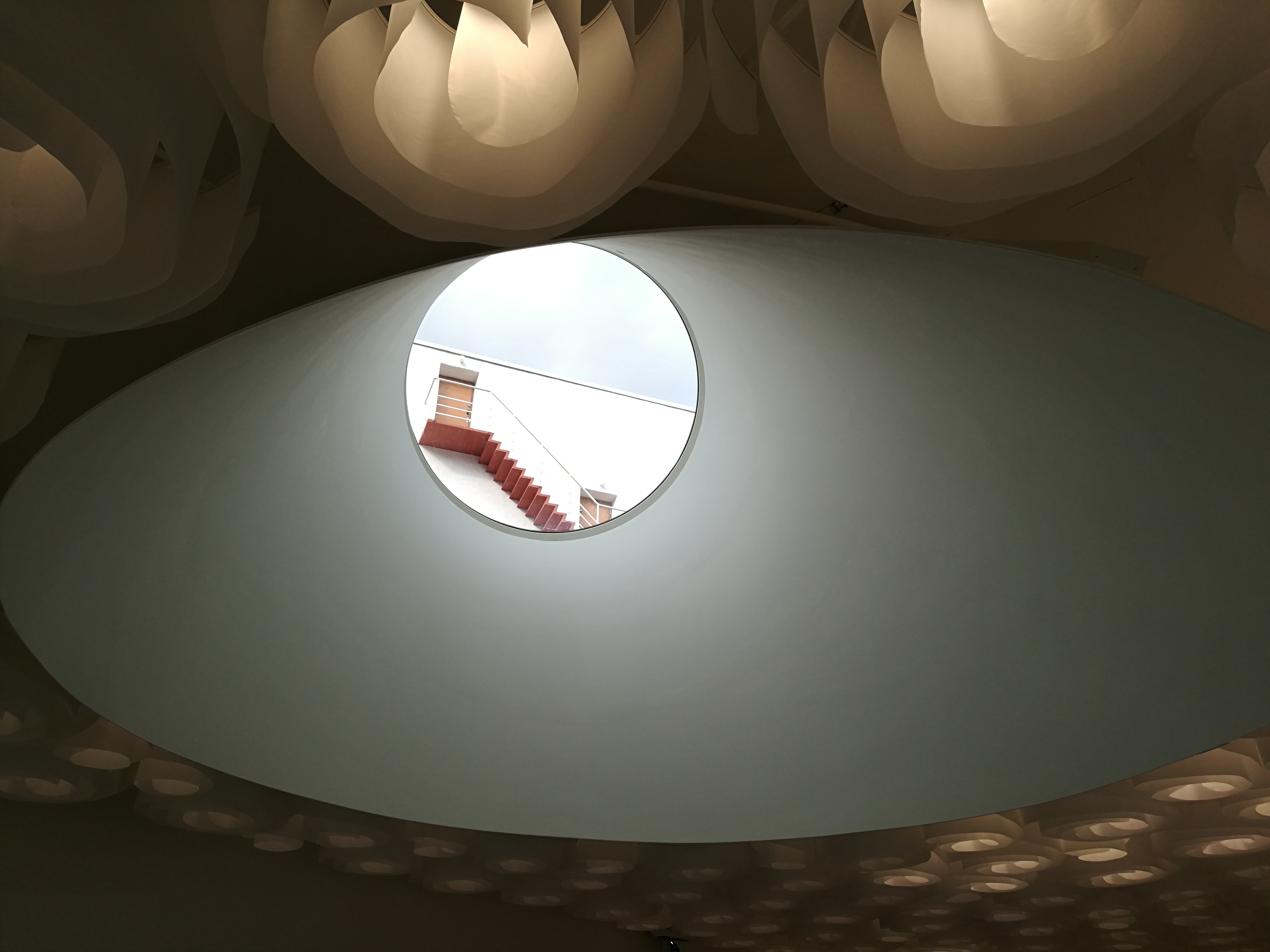

Amos Rex has received numerous awards and international recognition for its architecture and cultural impact. In 2021, it was selected as one of the winning projects of the International Architecture Awards, the world’s oldest and most prestigious awards programme for innovative architectural design. Organised by the Chicago Athenaeum, in collaboration with The European Center for Architecture Art Design and Urban Studies and Metropolitan Arts Press, the award honours cutting-edge projects worldwide.

In 2020, the museum won the AIT Award for “Best in Interior and Architecture” in the Public Buildings/Culture category. In 2019, it was named “New Cultural Destination of the Year (Europe)” at the LCD Awards, often referred to as the Oscars of the museum world. That same year, the International Interior Design Association (IIDA) selected it as one of six winners of the 47th Interior Design Competition and awarded it “Best of Competition.”

In 2018, Amos Rex was awarded Concrete Structure of the Year, an annual recognition for outstanding Finnish concrete construction. Additionally, the BBC highlighted the museum as one of the year’s most innovative new architectural works.

Amos Rex’s visual identity has also received multiple awards for its innovative design. At Vuoden Huiput 2018, Finland’s premier creative design competition, it won Silver in the “Identity,” “Design,” and “Experience Design” categories. In 2019, the Art Directors Club of Europe (ADC*E), which celebrates excellence in European design and advertising, gave it a Silver in Graphic Design along with a nomination for “Spatial/Experiential Design.”

== Publications list ==
- Amos Anderson Konstmuseum – Taidemuseo – Art Museum. Foreword by Bengt von Bonsdorff. Catalogue by Liisa Kasvio. Amos Anderson Art Museum’s publications, new series no 7, 1992.
- Malmström, Synnöve (ed.): The Donor's Works: Old Art in the Collections of the Amos Anderson Art Museum. Finnish Literature Society, 2015.
- O'Neill, Itha (ed.): Sigurd Frosterus: Art as an Attitude. Finnish Literature Society; Amos Anderson Art Museum, 2015. (Also published in Finnish under the title Sigurd Frosterus: Taide elämänasenteena and in Swedish under the title Sigurd Frosterus: Konsten som livshållning.)
- Malmström, Synnöve and Rauno Endén (eds): Birger Carlstedt: Modernismin haaste. Amos Rex publications 4. Parvs, Amos Rex, 2019. (Also published in Swedish under the title Birger Carlstedt: Modernismens utmaningar.)
- Meri, Mia: Egypti: Kala sarkofagissa & muita mysteereitä. Finnish Literature Society, 2020. (Also published in Swedish under the title Fisken i sarkofagen & andra mysterier.)
- Kronman, Gunvor, Tomas Lauri and Lars Nittve: Amos Rex Art Museum – JKMM Architects. Arvinius + Orfeus, 2021.
- Orenius, Melanie, Laura Porola and Ulla Donner: Breathe – You Know. Finnish Literature Society, 2024. (Also published in Finnish under the title Breathe – Niinku hengitä and Swedish under the title Breathe – Andas liksom.)
- Aittomaa, Sofia (ed.): Collection Sigurd Frosterus. Finnish Literature Society, 2025. (Also published in Finnish under the title Kokoelma Sigurd Frosterus and in Swedish under the title Samling Sigurd Frosterus.)

== Amos Anderson Art Museum, 1965-2017 ==
The Amos Anderson Art Museum (Finnish: Amos Andersonin taidemuseo, Swedish: Amos Andersons konstmuseum) is an art museum in Helsinki. It is the largest private art museum in Finland. The museum is currently situated on Yrjönkatu, with a subterranean annex, known as Amos Rex, built beneath Lasipalatsi.

=== History ===
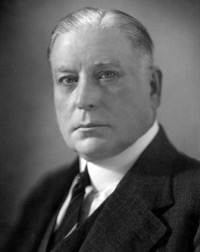
Amos Anderson (1878–1961), newspaper owner and founder of the museum

The museum was founded by Amos Anderson, the owner of the Swedish-language Hufvudstadsbladet newspaper and a patron of the arts. In 1913, Anderson commissioned architects W. G. Palmqvist and Einar Sjöström to design a building on Yrjönkatu. The building would function as both Anderson's private living quarters and office space for his businesses. After Anderson's death in 1961, the building was converted into a museum, which opened in 1965. As of early 2019, Luckan, a Konstsamundet financed center for Finland Swedish culture, moved to the Yrjönkatu building previously used by the museum.

Amos Anderson Art Museum
- Amos Andersonin taidemuseo Amos Andersons konstmuseum
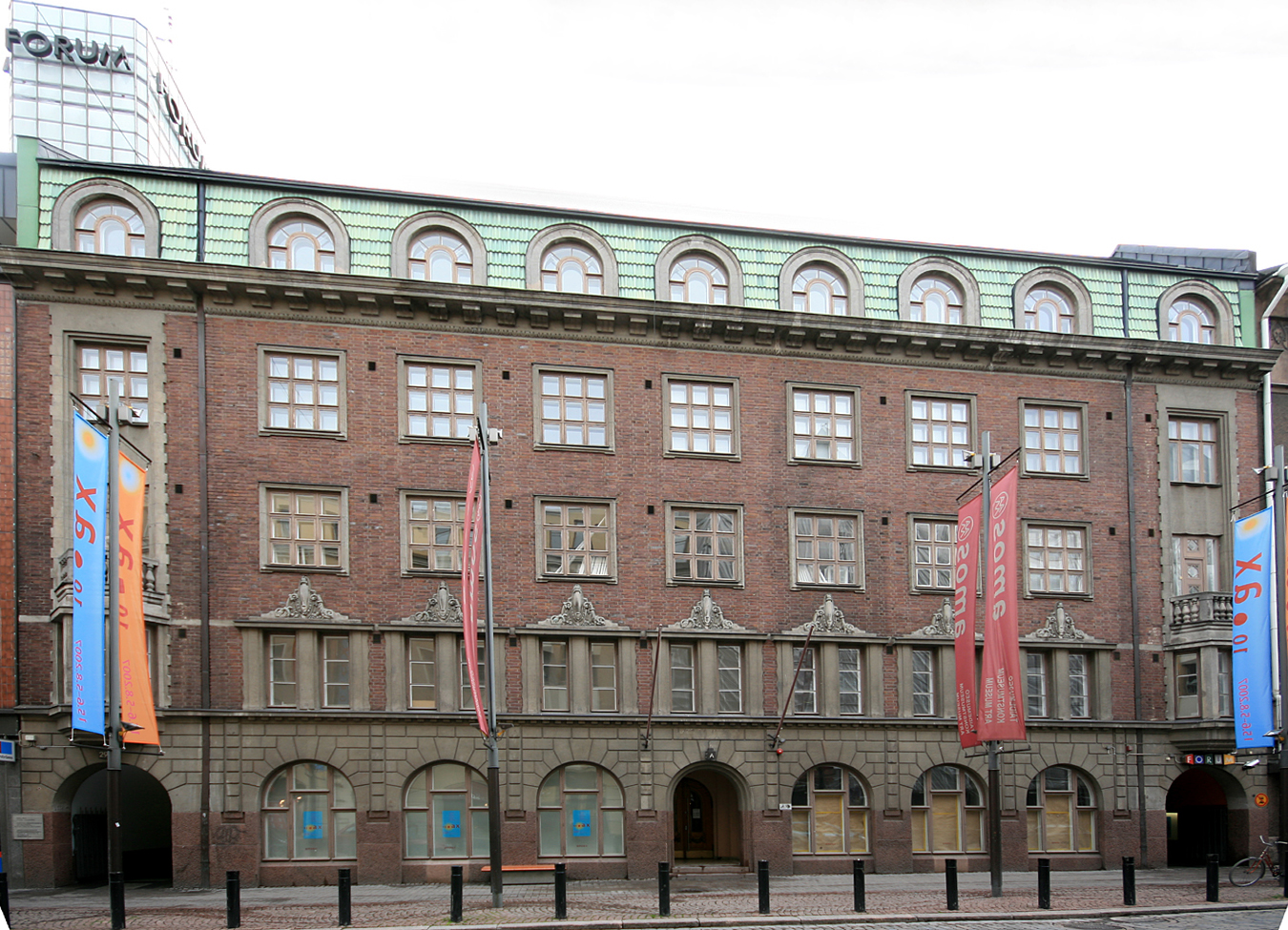
- Established: 1965
- Location: Helsinki, Finland
- Coordinates: 60°10′06″N 24°56′14″E
- Type: Art museum
- Director: Kai Kartio
- Website: amosanderson.fi

=== Collections and exhibitions ===
The Amos Anderson Art Museum's collections include primarily 20th-century art, with some of the oldest works originally belonging to Amos Anderson's personal collection. The museum has paintings by Francesco Bassano (Adoration of the Magi), Paul Signac, Louis Valtat, Roger Fry, Alfred Finch (View of Fiesöle), Ragnar Ekelund, Magnus Enckell, Eero Nelimarkka, Tyko Sallinen, Tove Jansson (Fantasy), and the Swedish painter Palm. In its acquisitions, the museum concentrates on contemporary art.

The museum arranges 8–12 exhibitions a year.

== See also ==
- Ateneum
- Helsinki Art Museum
- Kiasma
