= Haki Xhakli =

Kosovo Albanian painter (born 1952)

- Born: 3 October 1952 (age 74); Ferizaj, Kosovo, Yugoslavia
- Occupations: Painter, professor
- Known for: Painting
- Works: Apokalipsa
- Movement: Modern Art

Haki Xhakli is a Kosovo Albanian painter and a university professor from Kosovo. He is known for his composition paintings where figures of horse, castle and woman dominate.

== Life ==
Haki Xhakli was born on 3 October 1952 in Ferizaj, where he attended his early education. In 1978 he graduated from the Academy of Figurative Arts in University of Pristina, where he studied painting in the class of professor Rexhep Ferri.

From 1982 to 1988 he was leading the Artist's Association Zef Kolombi in Ferizaj. Since 1984 he has been a member of the Association of Figurative Artists of Kosovo, which he chaired from 2006 to 2008.

He has been working at the Faculty of Education since 2005, where he teaches art methodology to undergraduates and graduates, with the title of Professor Assistant at the University of Pristina. In 2010 he received a Doctoral Degree on Social Sciences at University of Skopje. In 2016 he served temporarily as the Dean of Faculty of Education at University of Pristina. Xhakli was also a national coordinator for curriculum development of art education in Kosovo organised by Ministry of Education, Science and Technology (Kosovo) from 2002 until 2012.

== Exhibitions ==
Xhakli participated in several international collective exhibitions and opened personal ones in Kosovo, Italy, Germany, Finland, France, Netherlands, Serbia, Macedonia and Albania.

In Kosovo, he had ten solo exhibitions and participated in forty four (44) collective exhibitions.

- 1983 – Culture House, Ferizaj, Kosovo
- 1993 – Cafe Gallery "Kata", Ferizaj, Kosovo
- 1994 – Cafe "Bolero", Ferizaj, Kosovo
- 1995 – SHKA "Agimi", Prizren, Kosovo
- 1996 – Gallery "Rada", Prizren, Kosovo
- 1999 – Hellweg-Museum, Unna, Germany
- 1999 – Katharinen-Hoff, Unna, Germany
- 2000 – Art Gallery, Ferizaj, Kosovo
- 2002 – Culture House, Kaçanik, Kosovo
- 2003 – Gallery of Ministry of Culture, Pristina, Kosovo
- 2006 – Gallery of Ministry of Culture, Pristina, Kosovo
- 2011 – National History Museum, Tirana, Albania
- 2014 – Show Your Hope, Eindhoven, Netherlands
- 2016 – Embassy of Kosovo, Berlin, Germany
- 2020 – Assembly of the Republic of Kosovo, Pristina, Kosovo
- 2022 – National Theatre of Opera and Ballet of Albania, Tirana, Albania
- 2024 – Luckan Cultural Centre, Helsinki, Finland

During his career he spent time in Florence, Italy and Unna, Germany where he was a personal tutor of painters Ilona Hetmann and Hans Wegener.

== Gallery ==
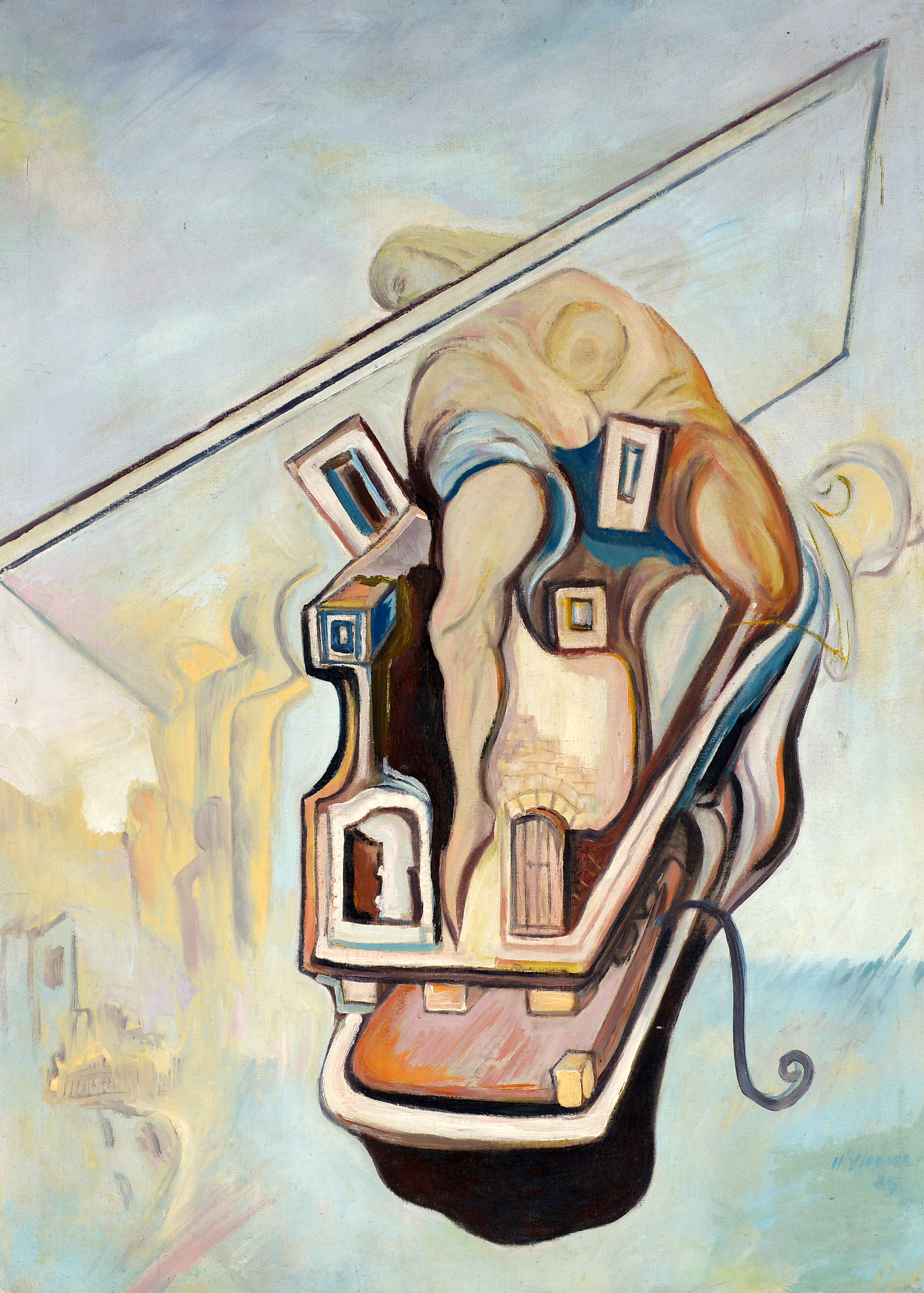
The Castle in Motion (1985), oil in canvas, 77 x 57 cm

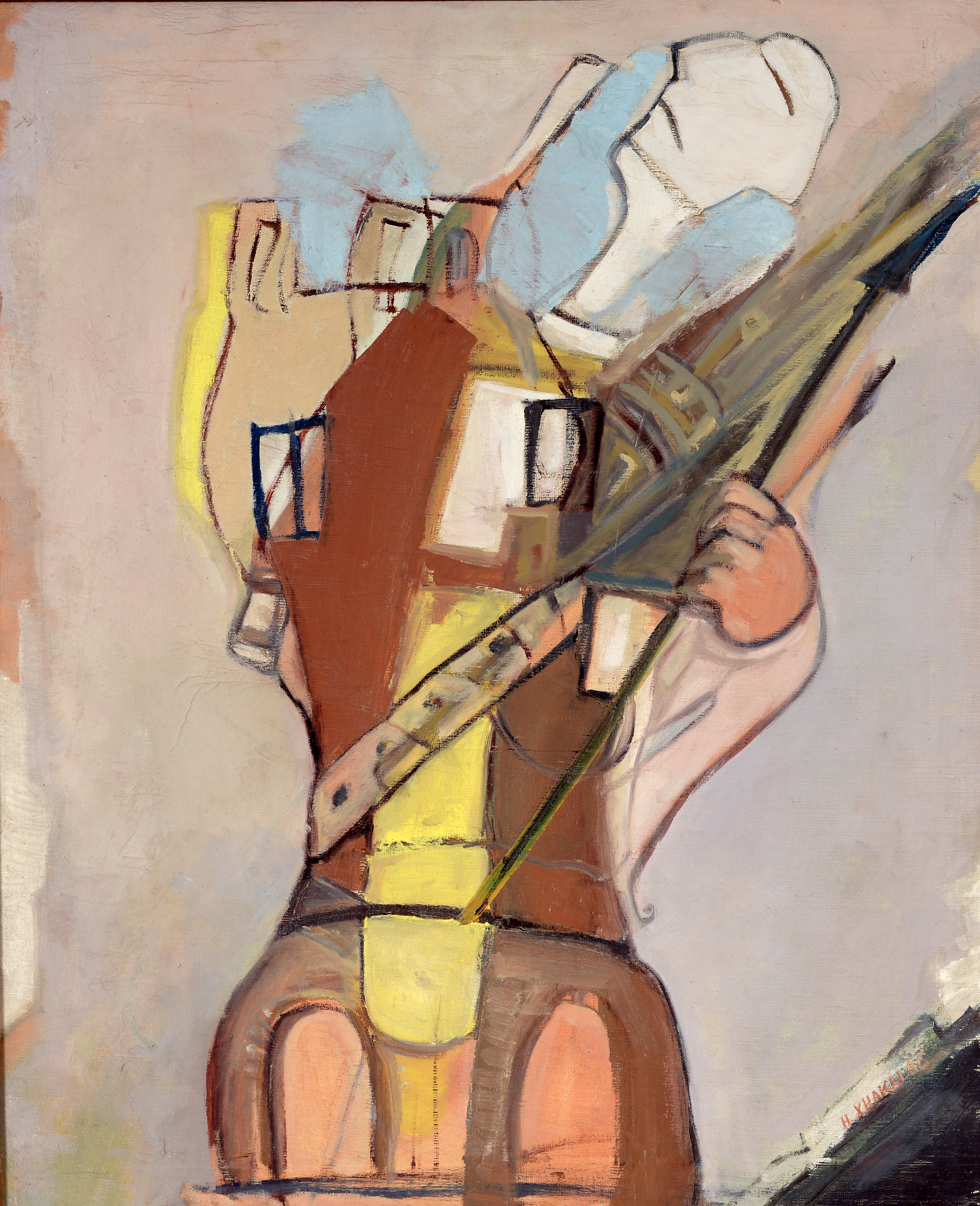
Don Quixote (1986), oil in canvas, 75 x 60 cm

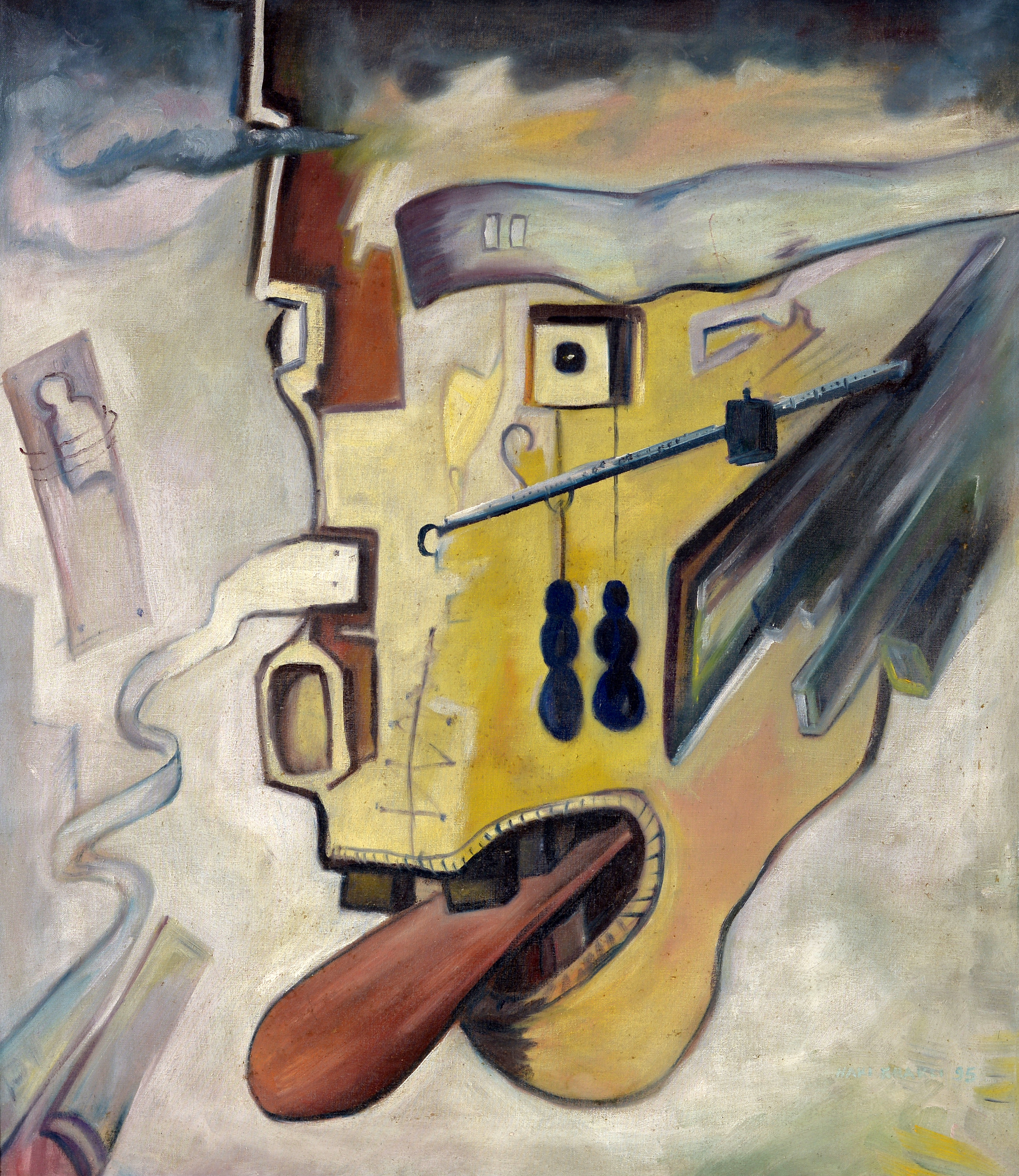
Dialogue (1995), oil in canvas, 80 x 100 cm

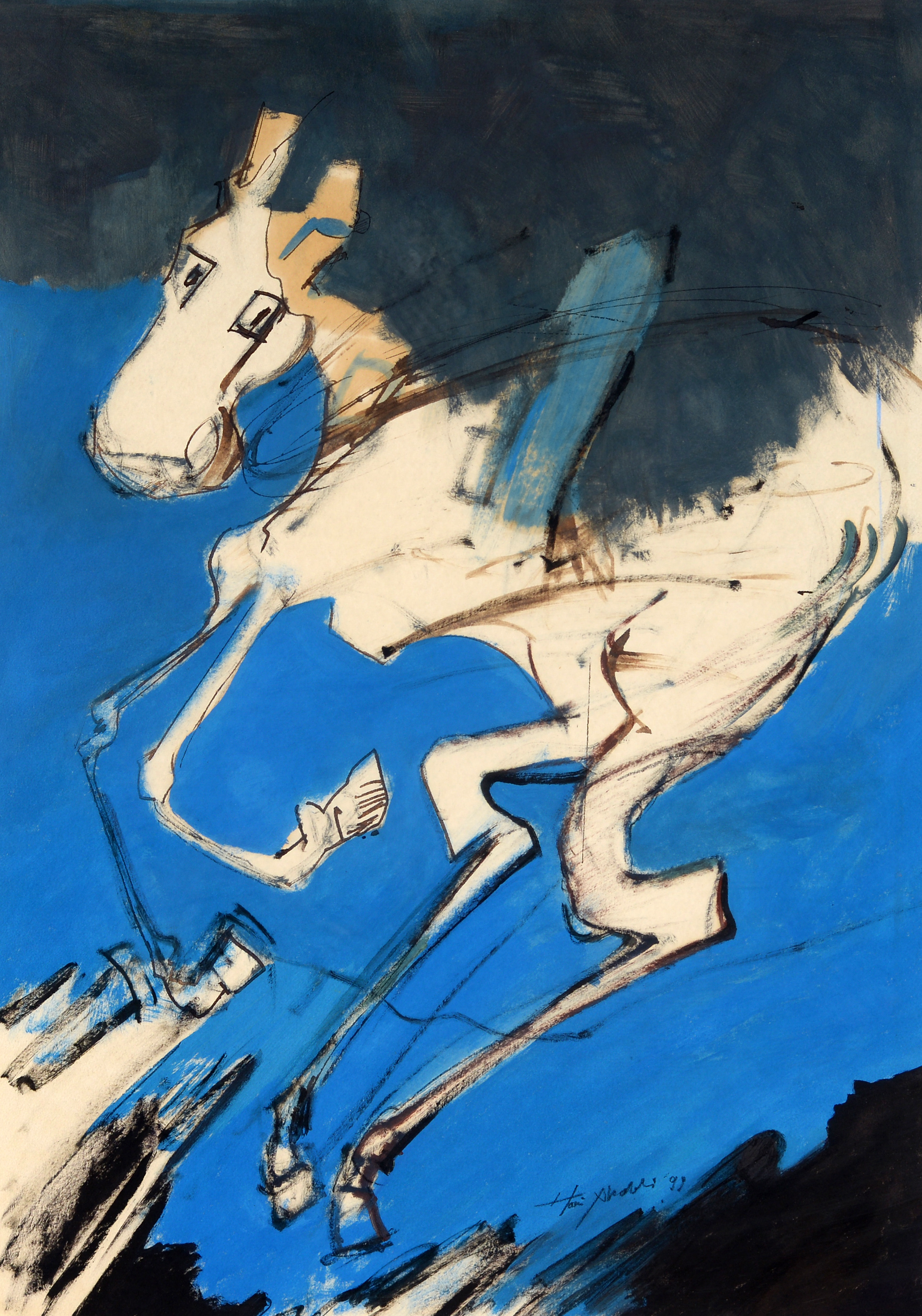
White Present (1991), combined technique, 68 x 48 cm

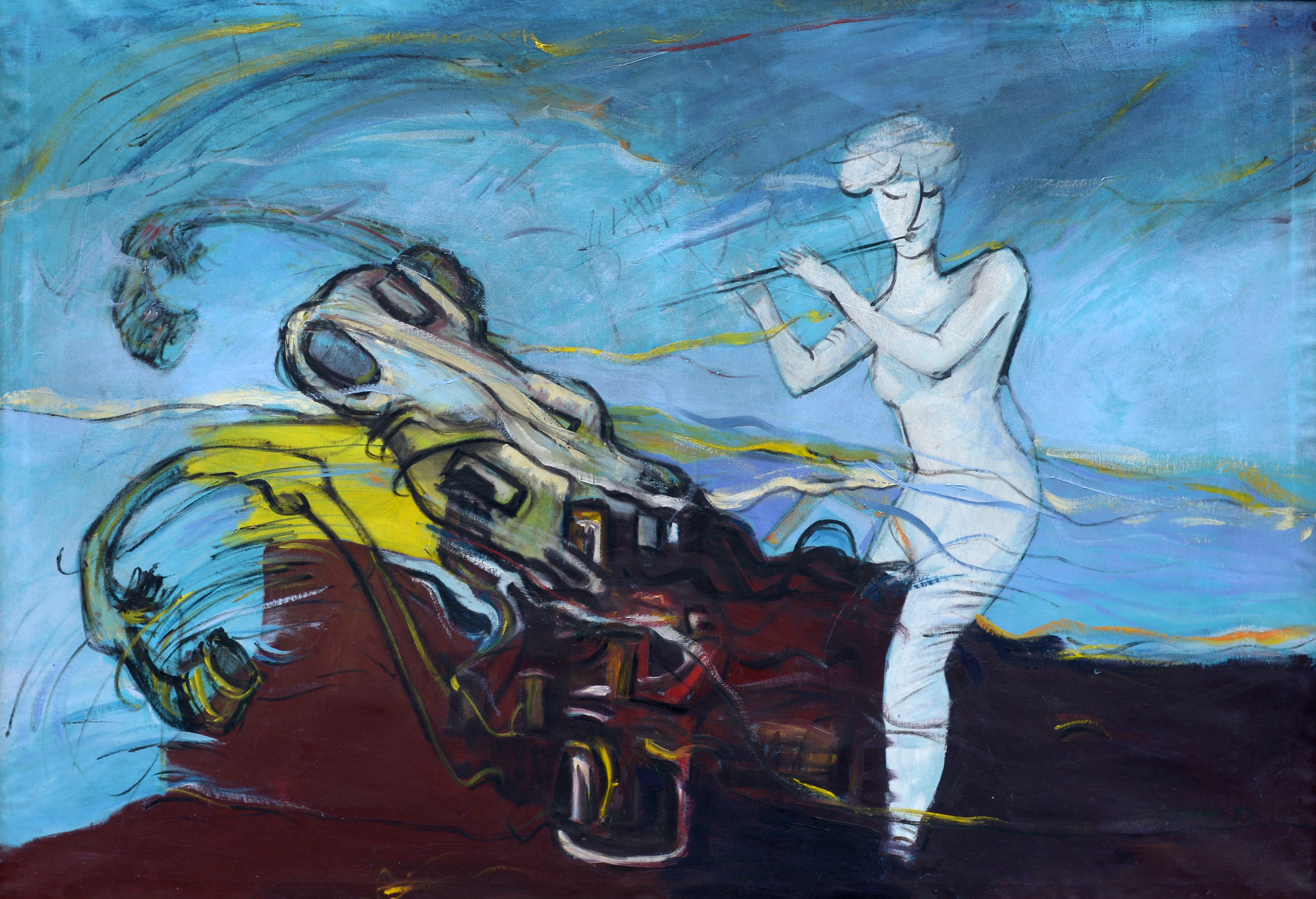
The Shepherdess (1997), oil in canvas, 90 x 130 cm

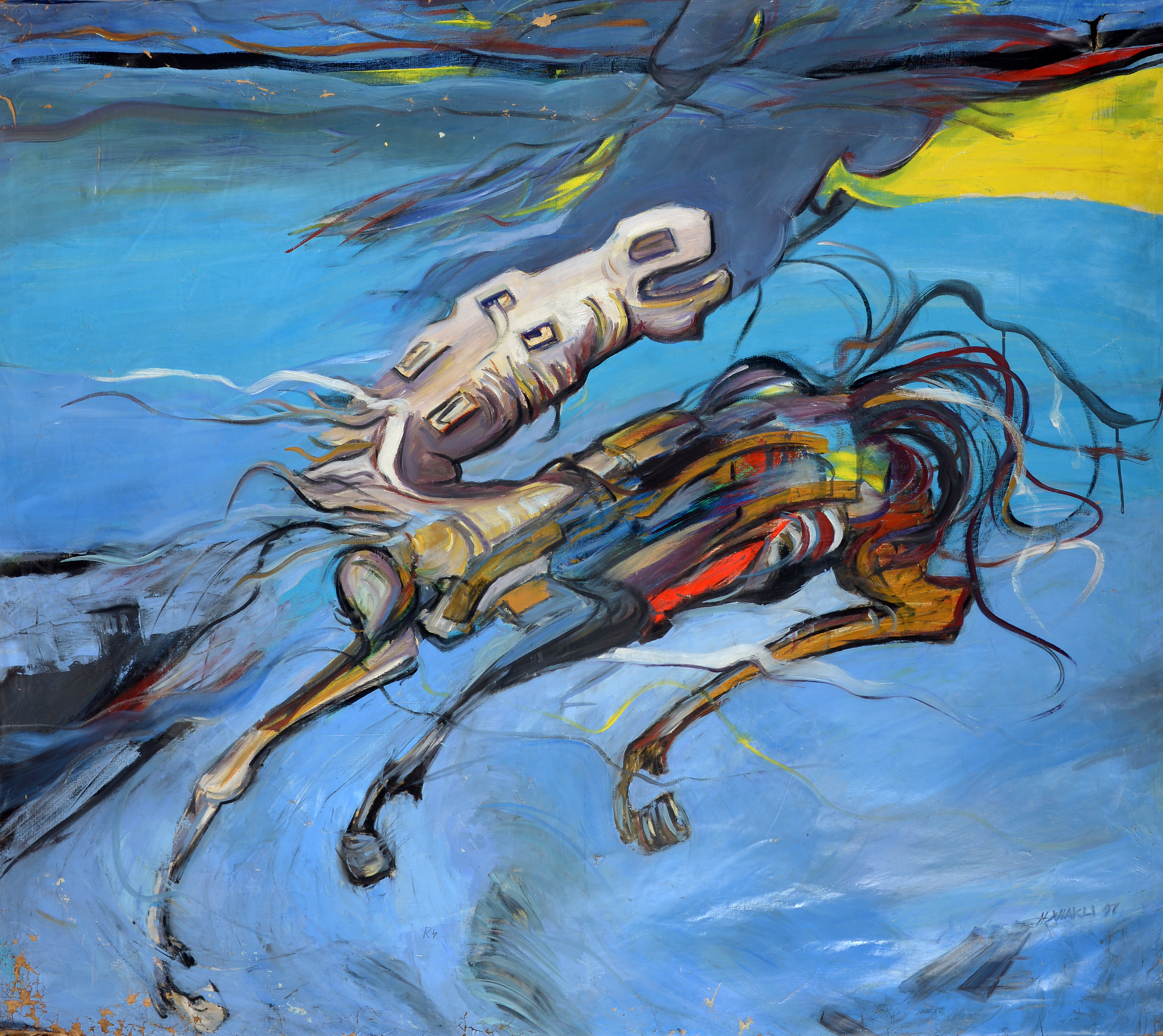
The Restless Horse (1997), oil in canvas, 135 x 155 cm

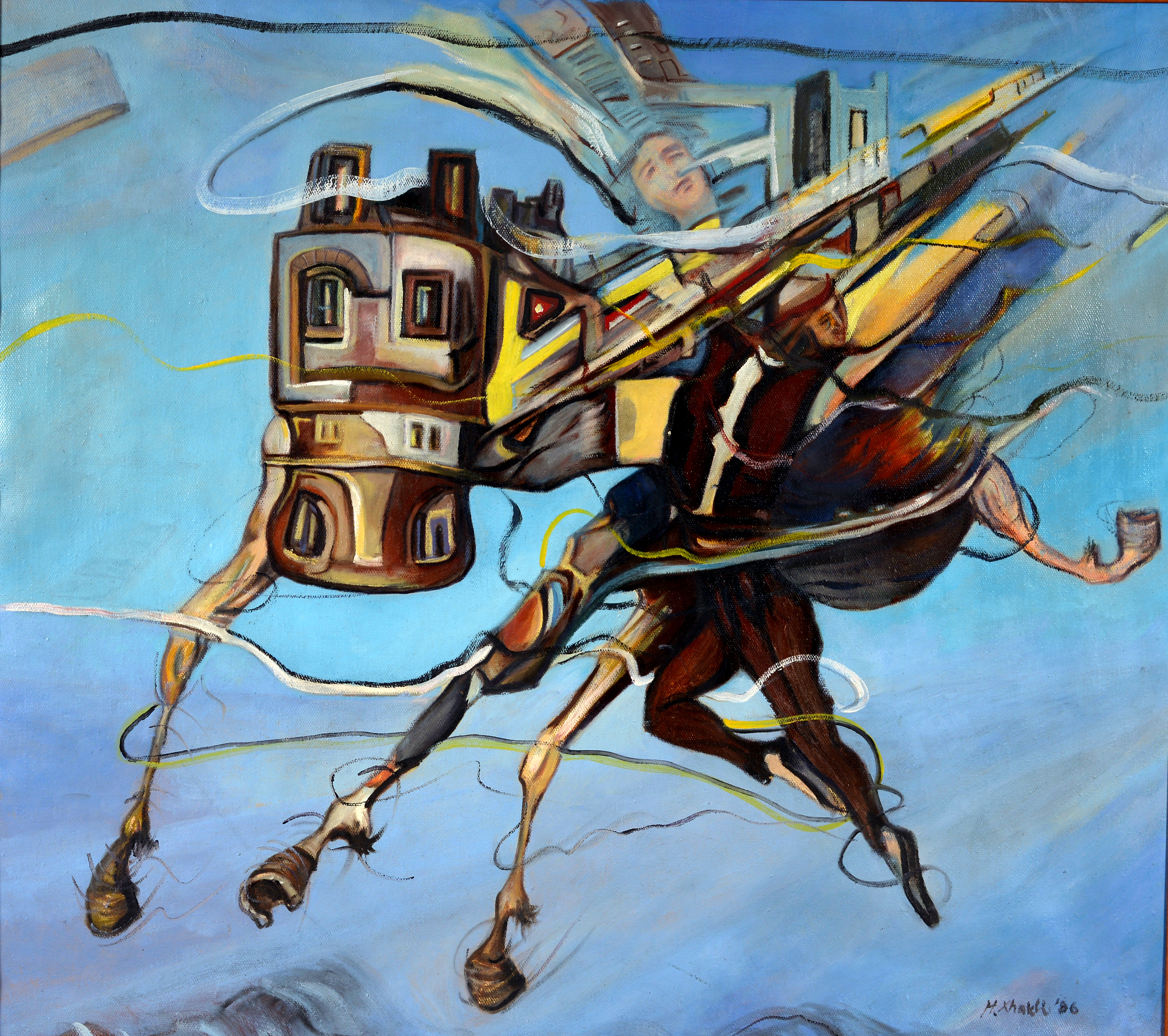
Little Constantine (1996), oil in canvas, 110 x 120 cm

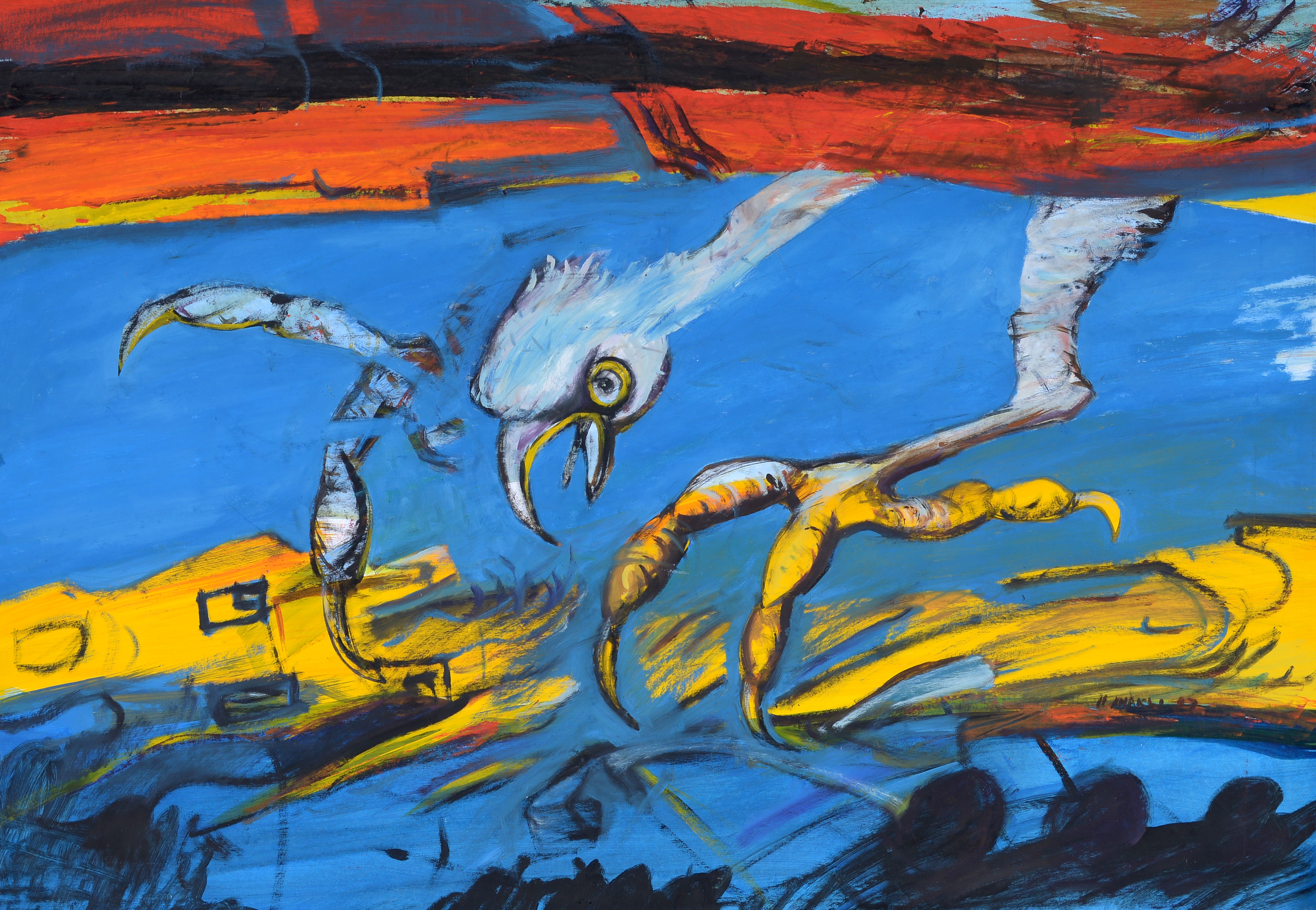
The Restless Bird (1997), acryl in paper, 50 x 70 cm

== Work ==
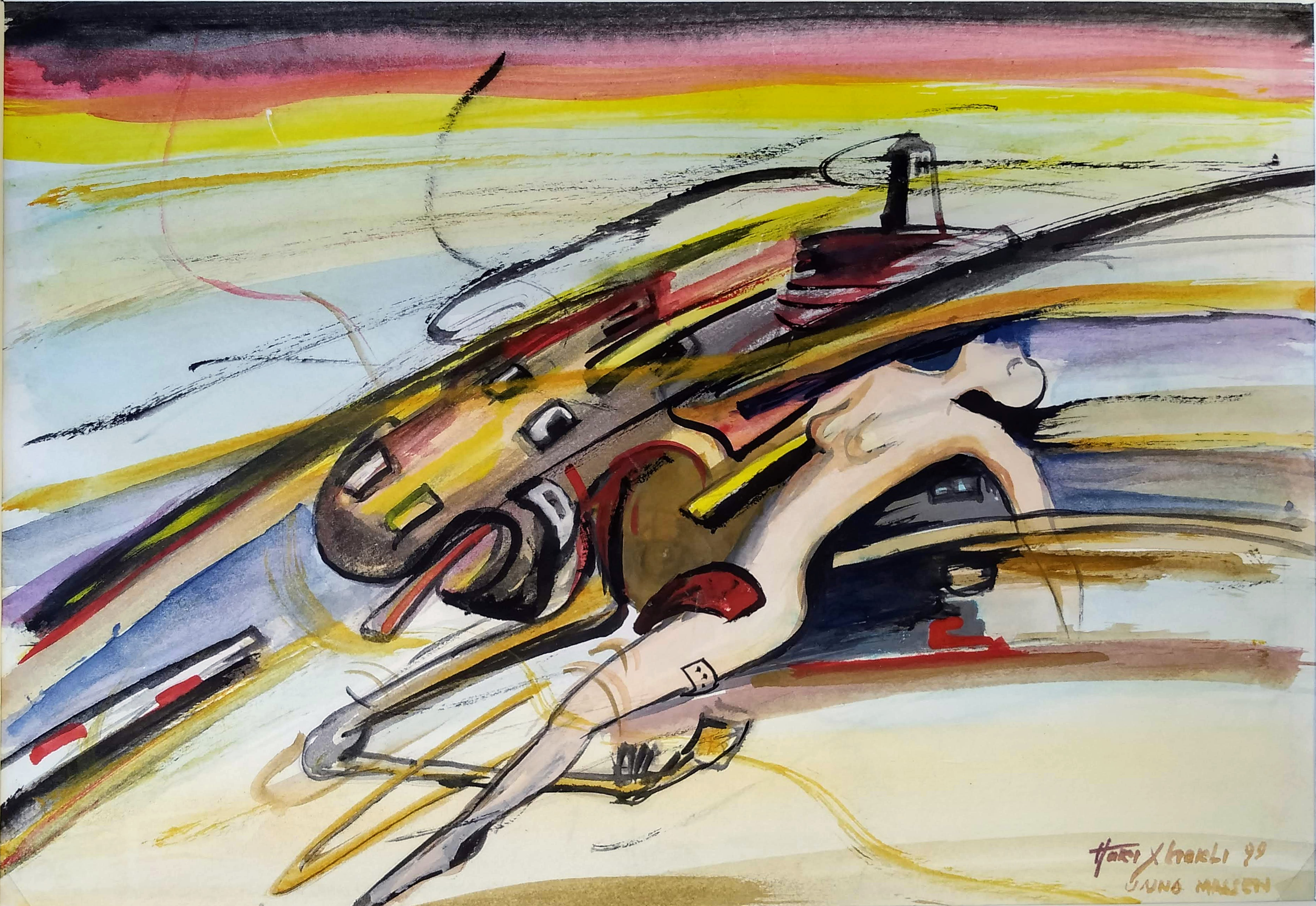
Apocalypse

Haki Xhakli’s paintings incorporate symbolic elements that draw on both universal themes and references to local cultural and historical experiences. His work is influenced by everyday life as well as the historical context of his region.

The symbol which is present in almost every painting of the artist is the horse. It brings up multiple associations with everyday life. It is portrayed as the symbol of faithfulness, but also of the burden that holds upon itself. The horse symbol represents the inescapable feeling of alertness and vigilance. With this detail, the artist reminds the audience for the struggles of the Albanian people for centuries.

In line with the horse symbol and its head, there is the symbol of the castle that connects well with high rooftops and small turrets, this symbolises the national resistance and the never-ending danger from various occupants. Its shielded walls used as a protection from enemies indicates the coldness of the stones absorbing from outside and the warmth inside that is offered through hospitality to every friend.

Through many symbols, he empowers his painting by elevating it to a high degree of universal semiotics, which receives a polysemic message, which then is not difficult to be accepted by artisans regardless of the relevance. One particular painting cycle that Xhakli created is the Apocalypse, as it makes the viewer think that it is the end of the world, in fact, it is portrayed as the end of the dreadful side of the universe.

== Publications ==
- Xhakli, Haki (2007). "Shkolla dhe shëndeti mental (Doracak për arsimtarë)". Kosovo: Center for Promotion of Education. p. 67. ISBN 978-9951-8549-0-0.
- Xhakli, Haki (2008). "Mobilising institutional and human resources of the school system". NATO Science for Peace and Security Series - E: Human and Societal Dynamics. pp. 85–113. ISBN 978-1-60750-037-7.
- Xhakli, Haki (2008). "Vështrim për edukatën figurative dhe metodologjinë e mësimdhënies". University of Prishtina, Faculty of Education, Educologia 2/2008: 177–179.
- E. Baloch-Kaloianov; A. Mikus-Kos; H. Xhakli (2009). "Activating Psychosocial Local Resources in Territories Affected by War and Terrorism". IOS Press. pp. 11–. ISBN 978-1-60750-449-8.
- Xhakli, Haki (2010). "Loja si aktivitet dëfryes dhe edukativ i fëmijës". University of Prishtina, Faculty of Education, Educologia 4/2008. 4: 353–355, KUD394.3, 398.82-053.4/.5(496.51).
- Xhakli, Haki (2011). "Trashëgimia në formimin dhe edukimin e fëmijës. (Heritage in the formation and education of the child)". Malësia. 6: 133–147, COBISS.CG-ID: 20703760. ISSN 1800-5764.
- Xhakli, Haki (2013). "Roli i edukatorëve për zhvillimin e kreativitetit dhe të gjuhës të fëmijëve parashkollorë. (The Role of Educators in the Creative Development of the Pre-school Children's Language)". University Fan S.Noli, Fakulteti i Edukimit dhe Filologjisë, Departmenti i Gjuhës dhe i Letërsisë. 2013: 200–203). ISBN 978-9928-167-04-0.
- Xhakli, Haki (2013). "Komunikimi - Proces i realizimit të kontaktit". Studime Sociolinguistike, Libraria Kotti. 2013. ISBN 978-9928-167-04-0.
- Xhakli, Haki (2016). "Metoda e Vlerësimit për ciklin Parashkollor dhe Fillorë. (Assessment Method for Pre-Primary and Primary Schools)". Reforma. 3: 454–456. ISSN 1800-9794.
