= Bendix Harms =

German contemporary artist

Bendix Harms (born in 1967, in Münster, Germany) is a contemporary artist. He studied at the Hochschule für bildende Künste Hamburg, MFA, 1991–1997. He lives and works in Hamburg, Germany. His work has been shown at the Prague Biennial (2005) and the first Tirana Biennale (2001). In the fall of 2004, he made his New York City debut alongside John Bock at Anton Kern Gallery.

Bendix comments on his mode of painting stating, “[...] I love artists’ late works—when they display a complete free style because it no longer matters whether their work will earn them applause or rap over the knuckles. They're beyond all concepts. And I love artists who anticipate their late work.

== Exhibitions ==
- 2009 Sabine Knust, Munich, Germany
- Until the End of the World, Andres Melas Presents, Athens, Greece
- 2008 Lebenslieben, Anton Kern Gallery, New York
- Friends and Family, Anton Kern Gallery, New York
- Galería Heinrich Ehrhardt, Madrid
- 2007 Burg Uns, Sabine Knust Gallery, Munich
- Size Matters: XXL, HVCCA–Hudson Valley Center for Contemporary Art,
- Peekskill, NY
- The Sorcerer's Apprentice: Late Picasso & Contemporary Painters, Galleri
- Faurschou, Copenhagen (cat)
- 2006 Solid As A Rock, Anton Kern Gallery, New York
- Bold Moves, Scenic, New York
- 2005 Prague Biennial, Prague, Czech
- 2004 Which Feeder? Two-person show with John Bock, Anton Kern Gallery, NY
- 2001 Musterkarte, Modelos de pintura en Alemania, Galeria Elba Benitez, Madrid;
- Galerie Heinrich Ehrhardt, Conde Duque
- Tirana Biennale 1, National Gallery + Chinese Pavilion, Tirana, Albanian
- Major Sponsen–ahead, Galerie Heinrich Ehrhardt, Madrid, Spain
- 2000 Galerie Karin Guenther, Hamburg, Germany
- 1998 Harms Hirsig Jung, Galerie Philomene Magers, Cologne, Germany
- Salon 98, Galerie Bärbel Grässlin bei Tishman+Speyer Properties Messeturm,
- Frankfurt, Germany
- Hirsig Harms Jung, Galerie
