= Forum (shopping centre) =

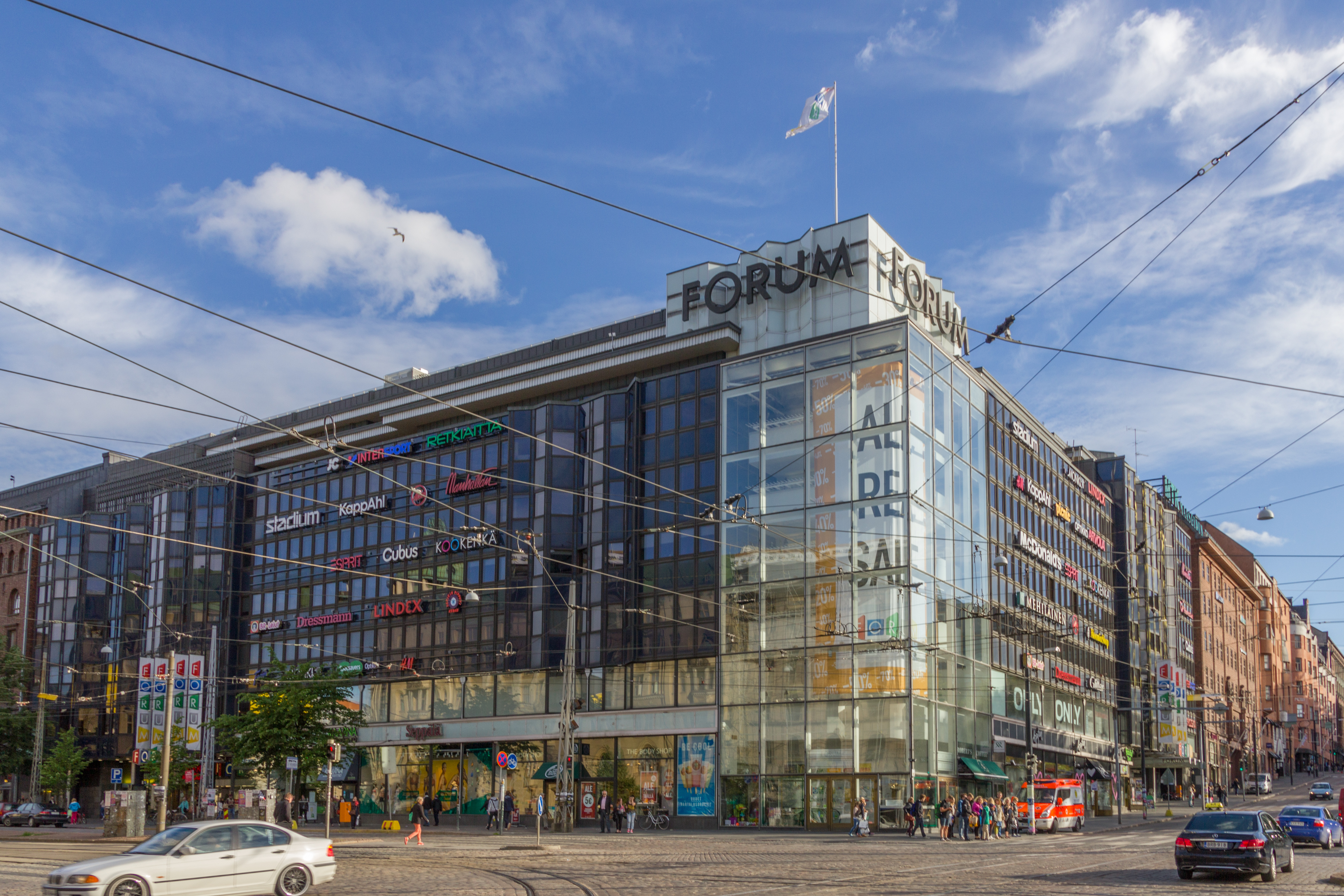
- Forum as seen from Simonkatu
- Location: Helsinki, Finland
- Coordinates: 60.16931°N 24.93802°E
- Opened: 1985
- Parking: 1,000 bays
- Website: www.cityforum.fi

Forum is a shopping centre in Helsinki, Finland, opened in 1985 and located between the streets of Mannerheimintie, Simonkatu, Yrjönkatu and Kalevankatu.

The original Forum building is located in the corner of Mannerheimintie and Simonkatu. The shopping centre has been constantly expanded to also fill other buildings in the city block.

The shopping centre includes an underground parking lot, with connections to the nearby surroundings, including to Stockmann.

As well as numerous businesses, the Forum city block includes the privately owned Amos Anderson art museum and the Forum medical and dental health centre.

Forum is the only privately owned shopping centre in the Finnish capital area. Bilinguality is emphasised in the shopping centre, because it is owned by Finland-Swedish organisations, most notably Föreningen Konstsamfundet, which was founded in 1940 by Amos Anderson. The organisation supports Finland-Swedish culture and publications, and deals out grants, which amount up to 3 million euro per year. This is financed by the rent from the Forum shopping centre building.
