= Samuli Miettinen =

Samuli Miettinen may refer to:

- Samuli Miettinen (footballer) (born 2004), Finnish centre back
- Samuli Miettinen (architect) (fl.1998), Finnish architect and a founder of JKMM Architects
- Samuli Miettinen (fl.1994–1995), a bassist for the Finnish melodic death metal band Children of Bodom
