= Luckan =

Finland-Swedish cultural centres in Finland

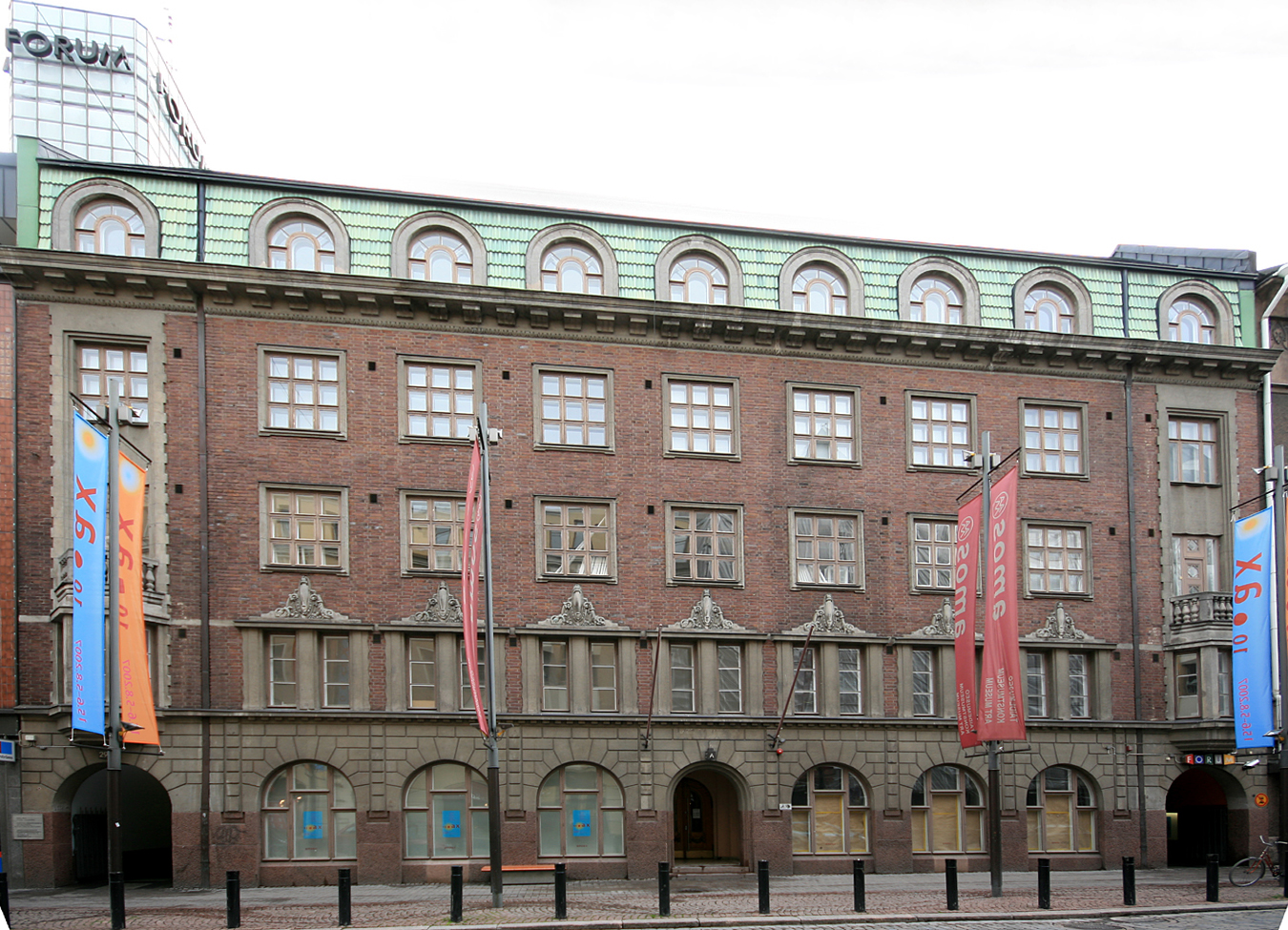
Since early 2019, Luckan in Helsinki operates in the building that used to serve the Amos Anderson Art Museum.

Luckan (Swedish for "ticket window" or "box office") is a network of Finland-Swedish cultural centres in Finland. Currently, there are located in 11 cities and towns in Finland: Helsinki, Kirkkonummi, Kokkola, Kristinestad, Närpes, Porvoo, Karis in Raseborg, Tampere, Turku and Oulu.

Luckan offers its visitors the cultural events, theme days and press conferences, free usage of Internet, information on the Finland-Swedish society. Luckan also offers to read the Swedish-language newspapers and over sixty branch magazines.

Luckan gives information on various events, education, Finland-Swedish organisations and societies, social welfare and integration in Finnish society aimed at immigrants.

Luckan was founded in 1992 in Helsinki by Nylands svenska landskapsförbund and Mellannylandsprojektet. The name Luckan refers to the organization's first location in Helsinki, a window near the ticket windows of the Swedish Theatre.

In November 1998 Luckan moved into Lasipalatsi/Glaspalatset. By March 2004 Luckan obtained new premises in the building of Forum shopping centre. In early 2019, Luckan moved within the Forum block to the building previously used by the Amos Anderson Art Museum. Both organizations have financial and other ties to Konstsamfundet, a wealthy patron of culture and the arts in Finland.
