= Amos Anderson =

Finnish businessman, publisher, politician, and art patron (1878–1961)

Vuorineuvos Amos Anderson
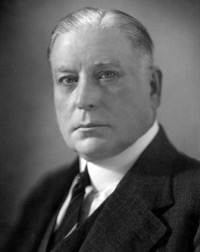
- Anderson c. 1940
- Born: 3 September 1878; Kimito, Grand Duchy of Finland
- Died: 2 April 1961 (aged 82); Dragsfjärd, Finland
- Occupations: Entrepreneur, publisher, patron of the arts
- Known for: Amos Anderson Art Museum
- Parent(s): Anders Johan Anderson and Alina Lindblom

Amos Valentin Anderson (3 September 1878, Kimito, Finland – 2 April 1961, Dragsfjärd, Finland) was a Finnish newspaper owner, publisher, art patron and member of parliament for the Swedish People's Party of Finland. He was the owner of Finland's largest Swedish-language newspaper, Hufvudstadsbladet.

== Biography ==
Amos Anderson was the son of farmer Anders Johan Anderson and Alina Lindblom. He grew up in the Southwestern Archipelago of Finland and studied business in Turku. He started his career in insurance, and spent two years in continental Europe studying finance and insurance in Göttingen and London from 1900 to 1902, and in Berlin in 1904. He began as an actuary for the insurance company Teollisuus-Palo from 1902 to 1907.

He started in press in 1905 by publishing Mercator, a professional magazine for the insurance sector which he ran until 1946. He was also the publisher for Finsk Tidskrift from 1908 to 1940. His career with daily newspapers started in 1911 with Dagens Tidning, and he was editor-in-chief of Hufvudstadsbladet from 1922 to 1945. In 1909 he founded a printing house together with Viktor Ek and J. O. Wasastjerna.

Anderson was an actuary for the insurance company Teollisuus-Palo from 1902 to 1907 and was involved in the boards of several banks and insurance companies throughout his career, including as a board member and vice-chairman of the Ömsesidiga Försäkringsbolaget Kaleva and a board member of the Sampo Insurance Company in Turku. He was also elected to the supervisory board of Unionsbanken and to the board of directors of Ab F. Stockmann.

Anderson was a Member of Parliament in 1922–1927 for the Swedish People's Party of Finland and a presidential elector in 1937, 1940 and 1943.

The story has it that Amos Anderson had two sides to his personality: by day he was a determined businessman, and by night sensitive and sociable patron of the arts and culture. He sponsored refurbishments of churches in Turku, Pargas and Kimito, and repairs of the Swedish theatre in Helsinki. He collected 250 works of modern art, which he left in his will to a foundation he founded, Konstsamfundet.

Anderson was also a great supporter of theatre. He served as chairman of the board of directors of Nya teaterhuset Ab, a member of the Stiftelsen för Svenska teatern, honorary chairman of the Swedish Theatre Association in Finland and honorary member of the Finland-Swedish Actors' Association. He was himself a writer and directed, among other things, Den stora världsteatern at the Royal Dramatic Theatre in Stockholm and at the Royal Danish Theatre in Copenhagen.

In 1913, Anderson commissioned architects Wäinö Palmqvist and Einar Sjöström to design a building on Yrjönkatu. The building would function as both Anderson's private living quarters and office space for his businesses. After Anderson's death in 1961, the building was converted into Amos Anderson Art Museum which opened its doors to the public in 1965.

In the 1920s, Anderson acquired the Tamminiemi villa on the western shore of Helsinki, which he donated in 1940 to the state to act as one of the official residences of the President of Finland. It served in this role until 1986, when, following the death of President Kekkonen, it was converted to a museum.

In 1948, a relief of Anderson was unveiled in the foyer of the Swedish Theatre. The relief was made by sculptor Gunnar Elfgren.

== Works ==
- Den svenska Ålandsexpeditionen och förhållandena i Stockholm under frihetskriget. Anteckningar och referat. Helsinki. 1919.
- Vårt ekonomiska och politiska läge: Valtal hållet i Åbo den 14 juni 1922. Helsinki. 1922.
- Vallis gratiae. Ett legendspel i åtta tablåer. Helsinki. 1923.
- Den svenska folkstammens ställning i Finland: Föredrag hållet i Åbo den 26 januari 1924. Helsinki. 1924.
- Våra politiska och ekonomiska förhållanden. Tre föredrag. Söderström & Co. 1930.
- Bilder från kampen mellan Rom och Byzans i Finland: Föredrag hållet i Stockholm och Uppsala 1928. Helsinki. 1931
- Depressionstider och samhällskriser i forntiden: Föredrag hållet vid Finlands tidningsförläggareförbunds årsmöte i Tammerfors den 10 augusti 1931. Helsinki. 1931.
- Ärkebiskop Nathan Söderholm i Finland 1927. Söderström & Co. 1931.
- Val av president och presidentens befogenheter i olika länder: Valföredrag hållet i Kimito den 11 januari 1937. Helsinki. 1941.
- Tal i Kimito kyrka vid kyrkokörernas sångtävlan den 1 juli 1945 och Festtal vid de åboländska sångkörernas sommarfest i Dragsfjärd den 8 juli 1945. Helsinki. 1945.
- Några synpunkter på jordöverlåtelsen: Ett diskussionsinlägg. Helsinki. 1945
- Hufvudstadsbladet under ett kvartsekel. Helsinki. 1946.
- Ett kvartsekels erfarenhet om opinion och press. Helsinki. 1946.
- En åbolännings intryck av svenska Österbotten. Helsinki. 1947.
- Vår kungsväg till Europa. Helsinki. 1949.
- Guss Mattsson och Dagens tidning. Hufvudstadsbladets presstjänst. 1954.
- Krisernas kretslopp: Två artiklar och ett föredrag kring ett tidlöst tema. Helsinki. 1954
- Minne och meditationer. Föreningen Konstsamfundet. 1962.

== Honours ==
- Honorary Member, Society of Swedish Authors in Finland (1945)
- Honorary Doctorate of Philosophy, Åbo Akademi University (1948)
- Honorary Member, Suomen Taiteilijaseura – Konstnärsgillet i Finland ry
- Honorary Member, Suomen Taideyhdistys – Finska Konstföreningen ry
