= Viikki Church =

- Finnish: Viikin kirkko Swedish: Viks kyrka
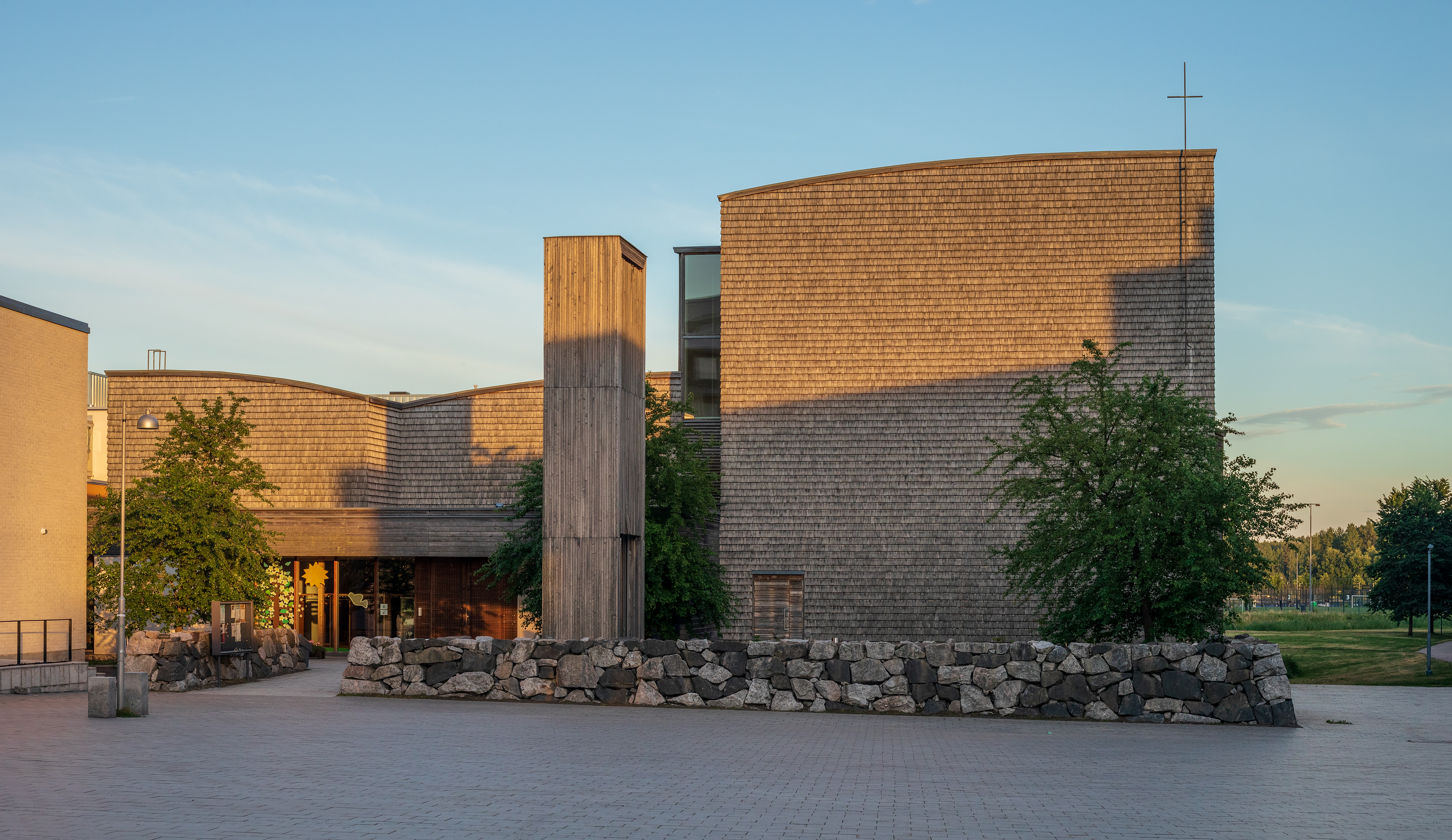
- Viikki Church
- 60°14′00″N 025°02′01″E
- Location: Viikki, Helsinki
- Country: Finland
- Denomination: Lutheran

Architecture
- Architect: Samuli Miettinen
- Completed: 2005

Specifications
- Capacity: 200

Administration
- Parish: Malmi

Viikki Church (Finnish: Viikin kirkko, Swedish: Viks kyrka) is an Evangelical Lutheran church in the Viikki district of Helsinki, Finland. Completed in 2005, it is the newest of the city's church buildings. The church was designed by architect Samuli Miettinen of JKMM Architects. The church is part of Malmi parish.

The church is mostly wooden: the floors, ceiling, walls and pillars are made of spruce and the outer cladding and double shingling are aspen. Furnishings are made of oak and aspen.

The church seats 200 people; when combined with the parish meeting hall the capacity is 400.
