= Elba Benítez =

Spanish art dealer

- Education: Complutense University of Madrid
- Occupation: Spanish art dealer
- Known for: owner of Galería Elba Benítez in Calle San Lorenzo, Madrid

Elba Benítez is a Spanish art dealer and the owner of Galería Elba Benítez in Calle San Lorenzo, Madrid.

Benítez has a degree in political science and sociology from the Complutense University of Madrid.

Galería Elba Benítez was founded in Madrid in 1990.

In 2016, she was included in Artnet's list of "Europe's 10 Most Respected Art Dealers".

Benítez represents artists including Vik Muniz, Ernesto Neto, Cristina Iglesias, and Miriam Bäckström.
