= JKMM Architects =

Finnish architectural firm

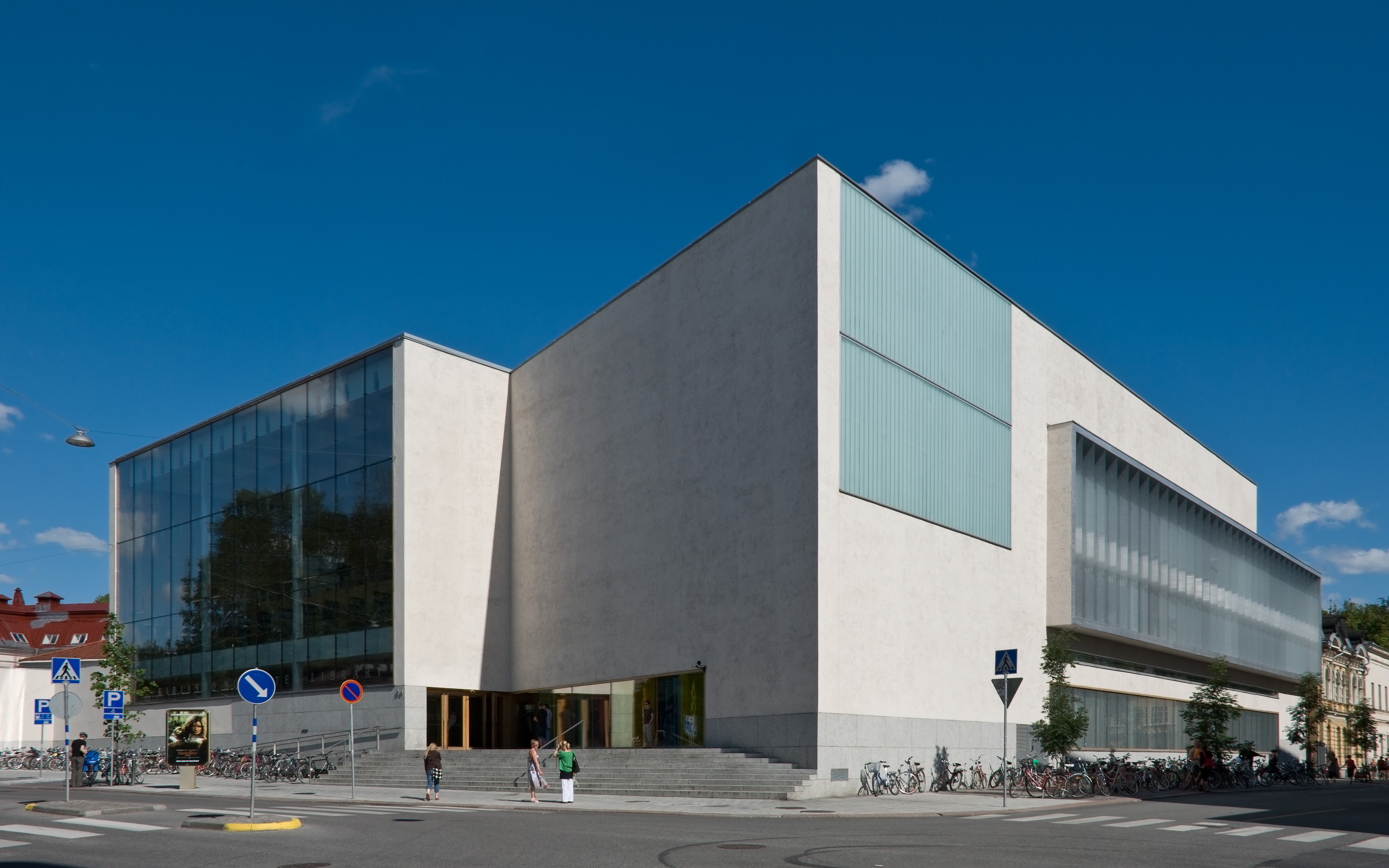
Turku Main Library, new building (2007)

JKMM Architects (Finnish: JKMM Arkkitehdit Oy) is a Finnish architectural firm. Asmo Jaaksi, Teemu Kurkela, Samuli Miettinen and Juha Mäki-Jyllilä established JKMM Architects in 1998.

== History ==
They started their studies in the middle of eighties. From the beginning, architectural innovation has been the driving force of their work. Studio's design approach reflects Scandinavian values and aesthetics. Their goal is to make architecture with exceptional architectural and technical quality. Over the years JKMM has grown and it employs over 80 professionals (May 2018). They operate actively in various areas and scales of architecture designing buildings, interiors, furniture, urban environments as well as renovations.

In spring 2018, there are several public buildings on the design table, such as the Amos Anderson Art Museum, new campus for The University of Fine Arts Helsinki, the Central Finland Central Hospital and Tampere's Tammela Stadium. Ongoing housing projects include the ATT housing buildings called Bysa & Sandis, which are being built in Jätkänsaari, Helsinki and changes in the old Pohjola city block in Helsinki. JKMM Architects recent works include Helsinki University Think Corner, Kalsatama School and Day Care, Lahti Travel Centre, the OP Financial Group's new headquarters, a library for Seinäjoki, a wooden church in Viikki, Turku City Library, and Verkatehdas Factory Cultural Center in Hämeenlinna as well as Finnish Pavilion for the Shanghai EXPO 2010 and Saunalahti house for Children.

== Recognition ==
The office has received several awards for its work including Finnish Glass Structure Award 2016 and 2007, Finnish Steel Structure Award 2015 and 2007, Finnish Concrete Structure Award 2012 and 2007, Finnish State Award for Architecture 2007, Chicago Athenaeum International Architecture Award 2006 and Pietilä Award 2006 inter alia.

== Selected works ==
- Viikki Church, Helsinki (2005)
- Turku Main Library (2007)
- "Kirnu", Finnish pavilion for Shanghai Expo (2010)
- Saunalahti Children's House, Espoo (2011)
- Seinäjoki City Library (2012)
- Alma Media headquarters, Helsinki (2013)
- OP-Pohjola headquarters, Helsinki (2015)
- Lahti Travel Centre, Lahti (2016)
- Viikki Youth Centre, Helsinki (2016)
- Kalasatama School and Day Care, Helsinki (2016)
- The New Think Corner, University of Helsinki, Helsinki (2017)
- Amos Anderson Art Museum annex, Helsinki (construction phase, completed in 2018)
- new campus for The University of Fine Arts Helsinki, Helsinki (design phase)
- Tammela Football Stadium, Tampere (design phase)
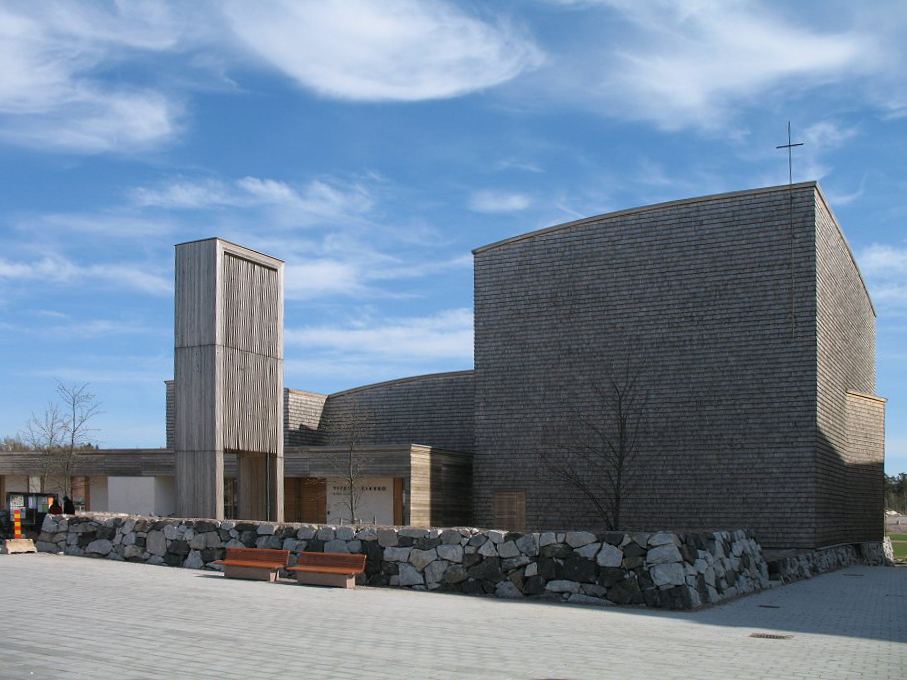
Viikki Church

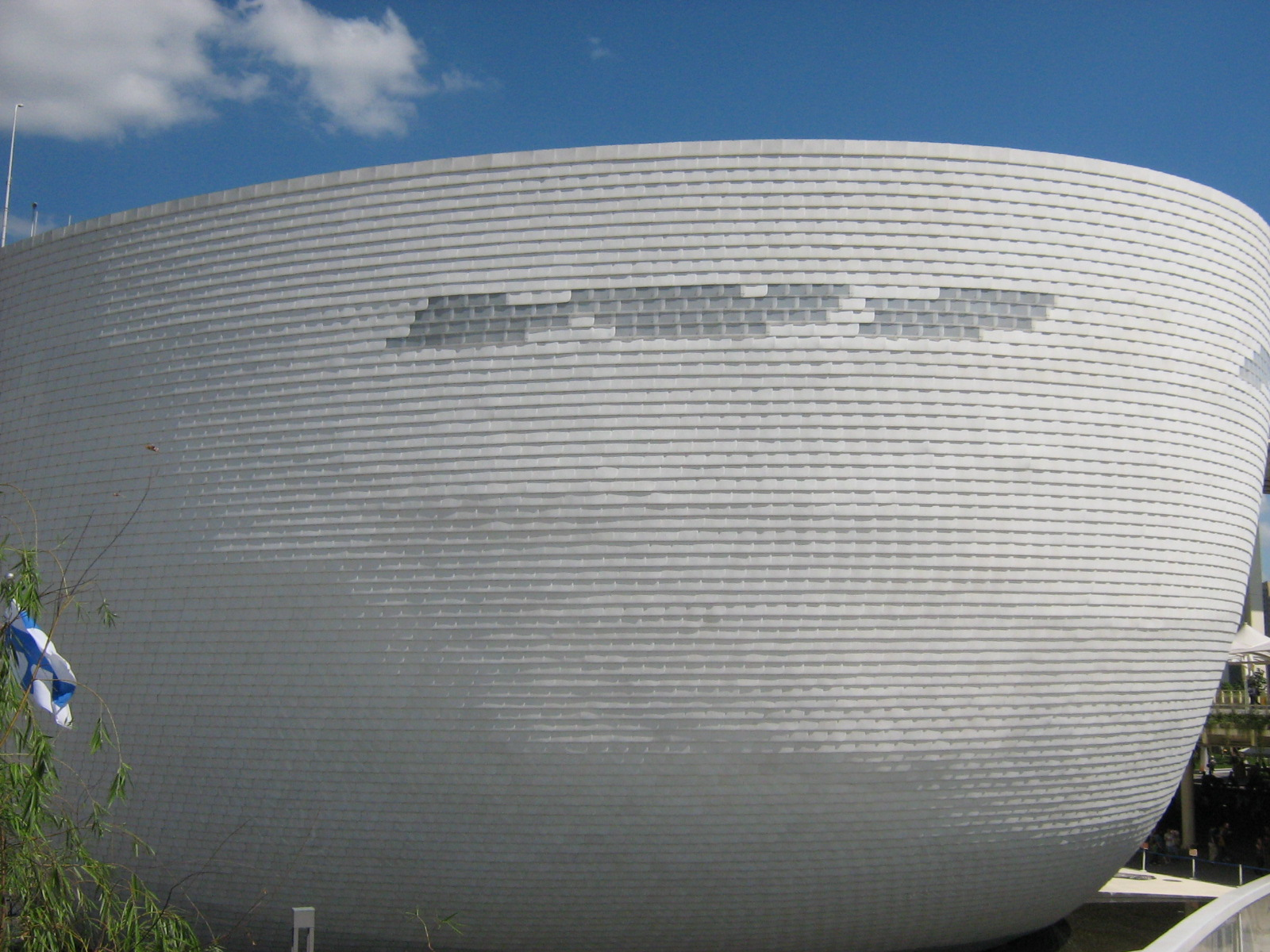
Finnish pavilion at Shanghai Expo

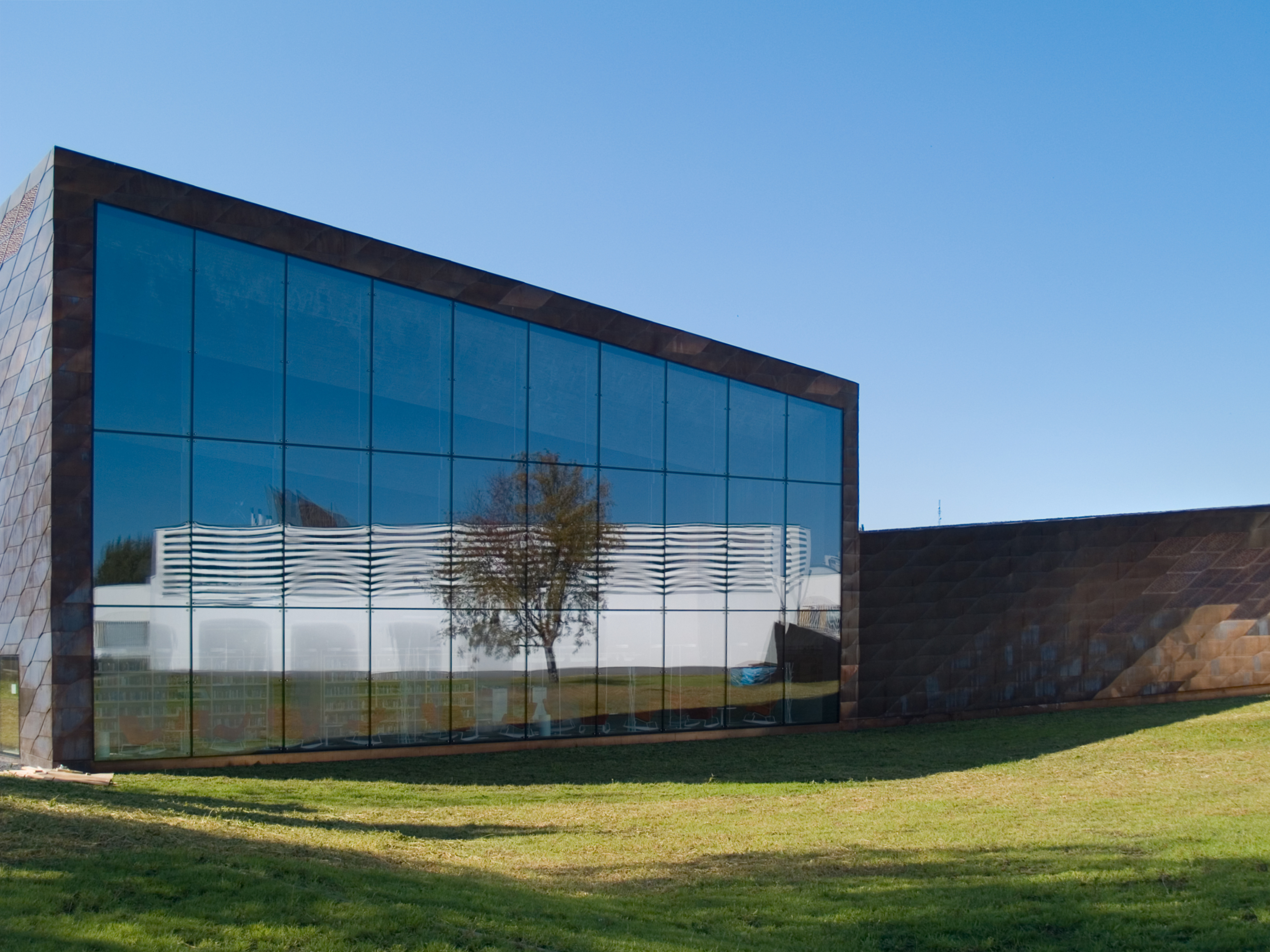
Seinäjoki City Library

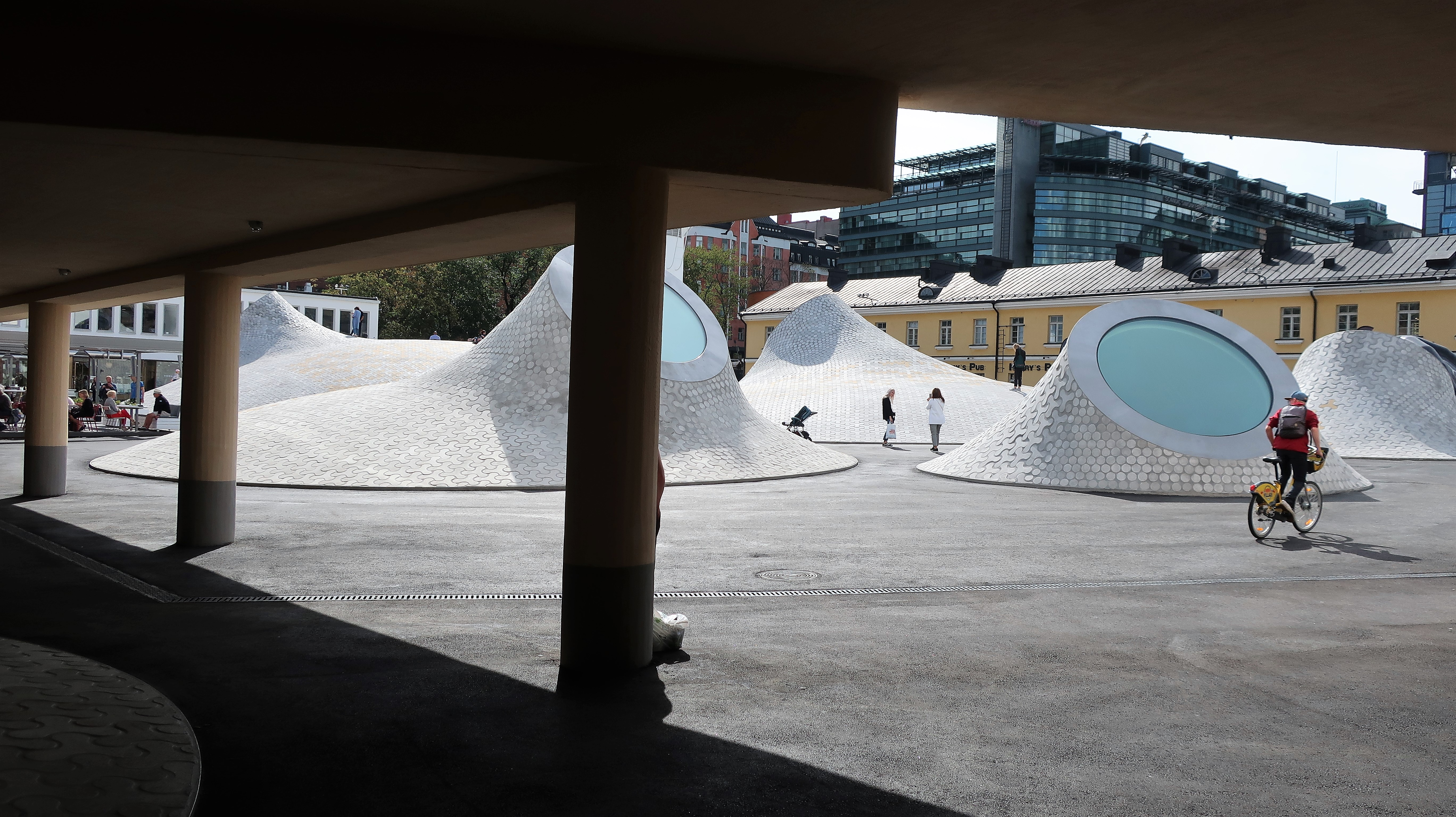
Amos Rex, Amos Anderson Art Museum annex
