= Konstsamfundet =

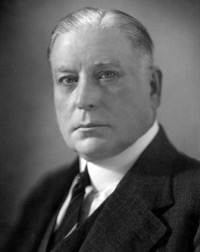
Amos Anderson

Amos Andersons fond is a Finnish association with the goal of supporting the culture of the Swedish-speaking minority of Finland. It was founded in 1940 by vuorineuvos Amos Anderson, a newspaper publisher and a patron of the arts who bequeathed his entire fortune to Konstsamfundet. In 2025, during the 85th anniversary of the association, it was announced that the association will change its name from Föreningen Konstsamfundet (lit. "The Art Foundation Association") to Amos Andersons fond in order to honour its founder.

Amos Andersons fond owns and operates the Amos Anderson Art Museum in Helsinki, the largest private art museum in Finland. It is also the sole owner of the Swedish-language Hufvudstadsbladet newspaper in Finland.
