= Miriam Bäckström =

Swedish photographer (born 1967)

Miriam Bäckström (born 1967) is a Swedish conceptual photographer.

Bäckström was born in Stockholm in 1967. Bäckström studied history of art at Stockholm University before enrolling at Stockholm's Academy of Photography in 1994.

Bäckström first came to notice as a conceptual photographer in the 1990s.
