= Wäinö Palmqvist =

Finnish architect (1882–1964)

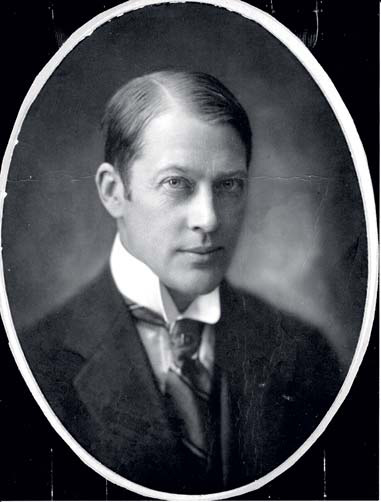
- W. G. Palmqvist, c. 1930s
- Born: 16 January 1882; Kalajoki, Grand Duchy of Finland
- Died: 14 July 1964 (aged 82); Helsinki, Finland
- Occupation: Architect

Wäinö Gustaf Palmqvist (16 January 1882 — 14 July 1964), commonly known as W. G. Palmqvist, was a Finnish architect best known as a designer of industrial and commercial buildings, especially the timber and paper mills and their wider factory milieus of the 1920s and 1930s, as well as several notable buildings in central Helsinki.

== Early life and education ==
Wäinö Palmqvist was born to civil servant Gustaf August Palmqvist and Selma Katharina née Ingman.

He completed his secondary education in 1900, and went on to study architecture at the Helsinki Polytechnical Institute (later Helsinki University of Technology, now part of Aalto University), graduating in 1905. Afterwards, he undertook several research trips around Europe, between 1907 and 1929.

== Personal life ==
Palmqvist was married twice: in 1910 he married Elsa née Ruuth, with whom he had three children; the couple divorced later. In 1925, he married Vivi née Candelin, and they had two children together. His son from the second marriage, Kai Palmqvist, also became an architect.

== Career ==
In the early part of his career, Palmqvist worked assisting notable architects of the time, including Gustaf Nyström, Birger Brunila, Armas Lindgren and Lars Sonck.

He ran his own design bureau, first, from 1910 to 1919, jointly with his business partner Einar Sjöström, and from 1919 onwards alone.

Palmqvist's designs were characterised by massive, imposing features in the classical style, contrary to many of his contemporaries' plain and minimalist works.

He was also active in many professional and public bodies, including as a board member of the Finnish Association of Architects (1918-1937; chairing it 1934–35), secretary of the Finnish Academy of Fine Arts (1922-1937), and member of various city planning and cultural panels of the City of Helsinki (throughout the 1920-30s).

== Notable works ==
Palmqvist was a prolific designer with a career spanning four decades. Some of his more notable creations include:

=== Industrial and commercial buildings ===
- Outokumpu mine facilities
- United Paper Mills factories in Valkeakoski, Jämsänkoski and Myllykoski
- Suomen Kaapelitehdas cable factory (now Merikortteli), Helsinki
- Hufvudstadsbladet headquarters, Helsinki

=== Public buildings ===
- Mehiläinen Hospital, Helsinki
- Aurinkolinna children's tuberculosis sanatorium, Nastola
- Central Kyme hospital, Myllykoski
- Vääksy hospital
- Ostrobotnia Student Nation House, Helsinki

=== Churches ===
- Padasjoki church
- Mänttä church
- Kalajoki church
- Jämsänkoski church

== Gallery ==
Selected Palmqvist designs
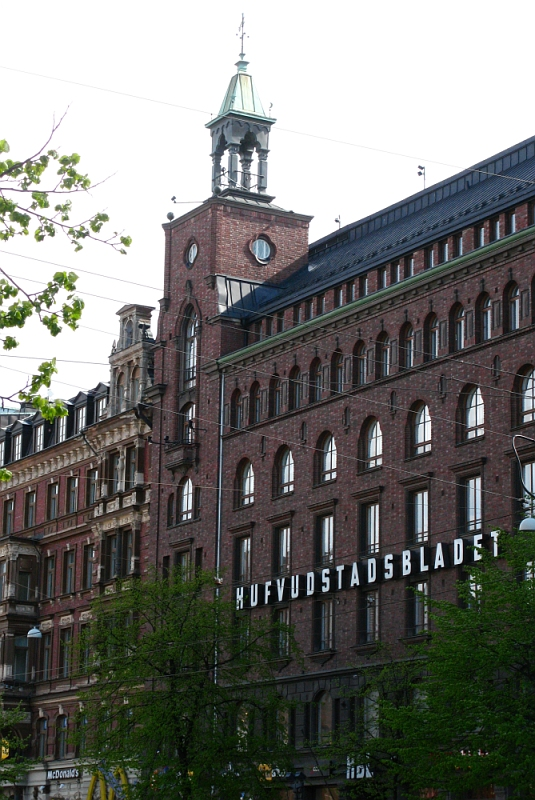
Hufvudstadsbladet HQ in Helsinki

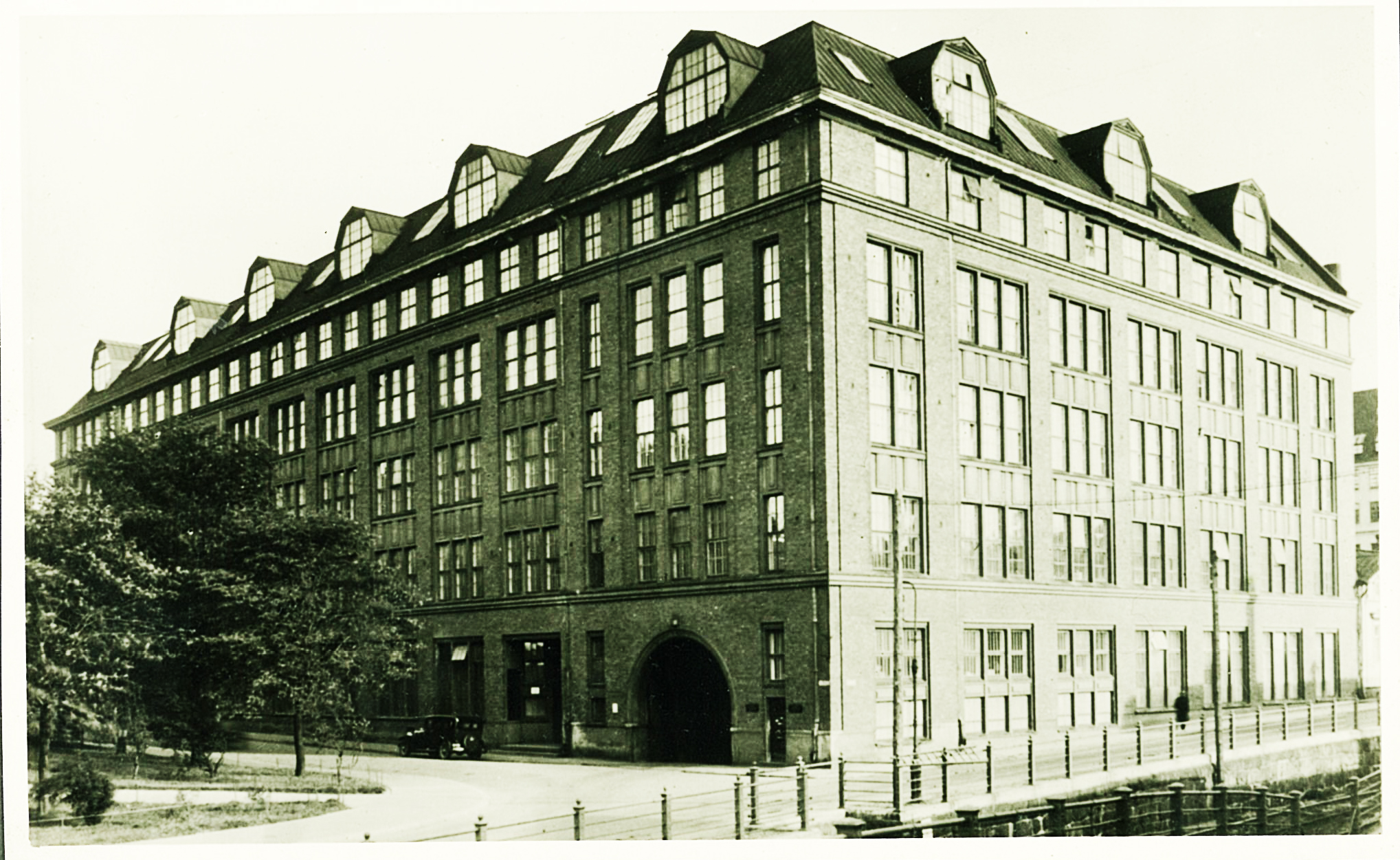
Merikortteli — originally a cable factory in Helsinki

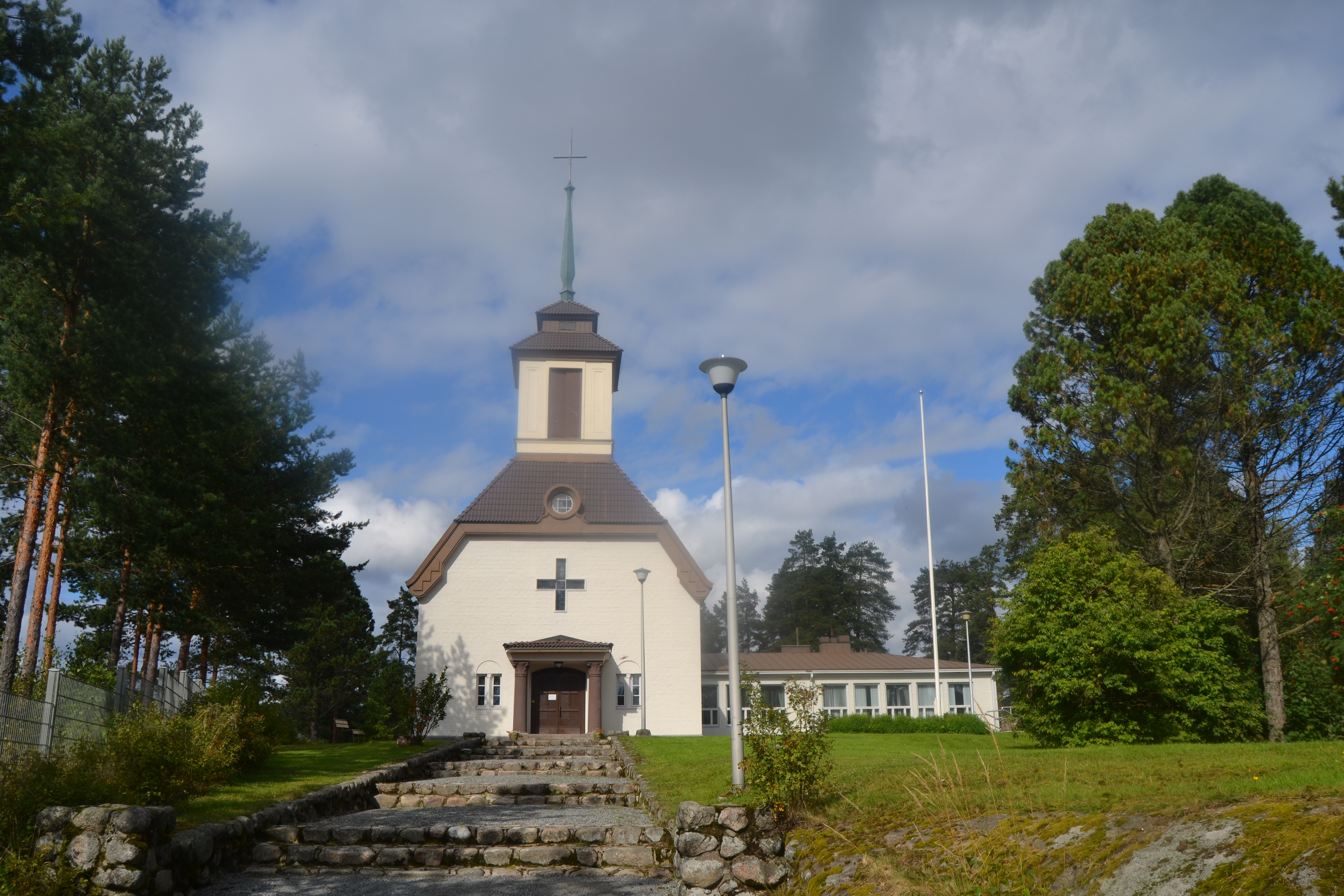
Jämsänkoski church

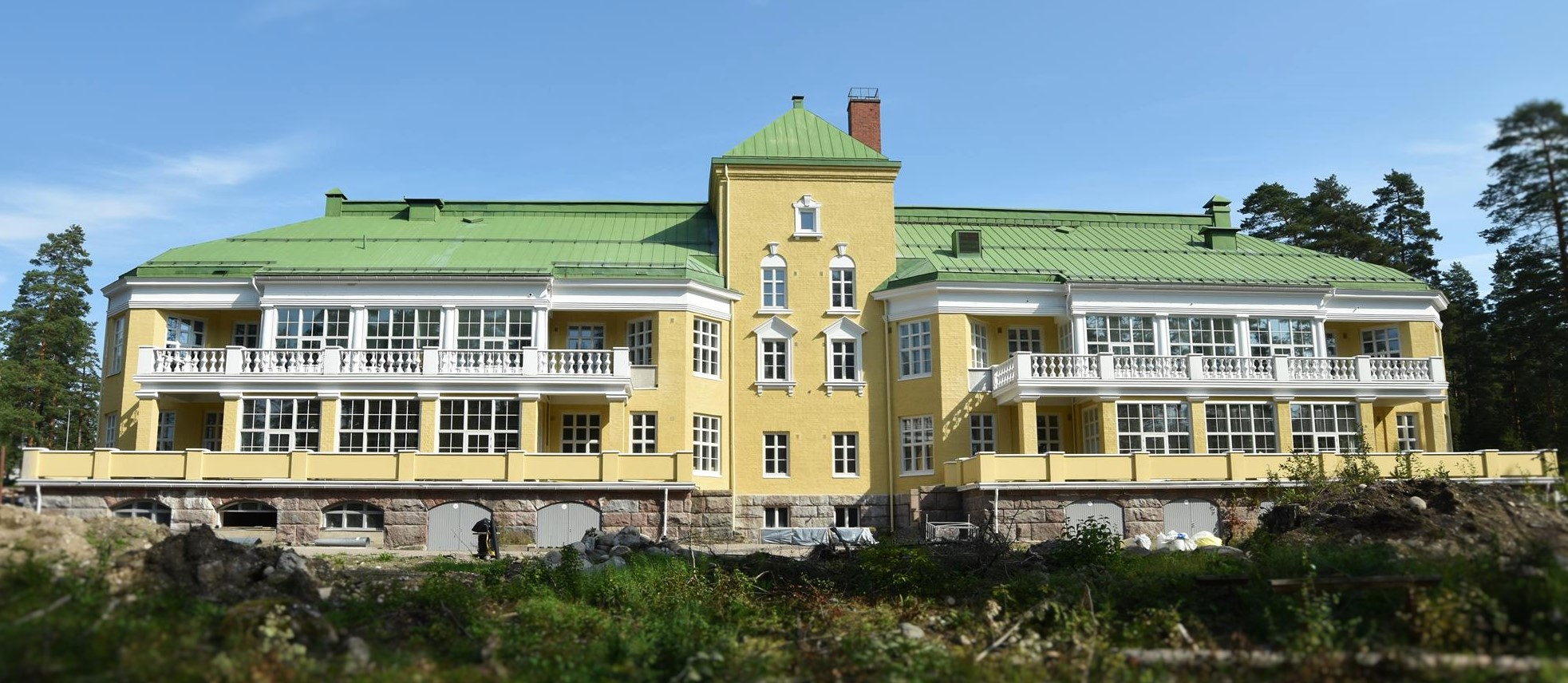
Aurinkolinna — children's tuberculosis sanatorium in Nastola (later converted to residential use)

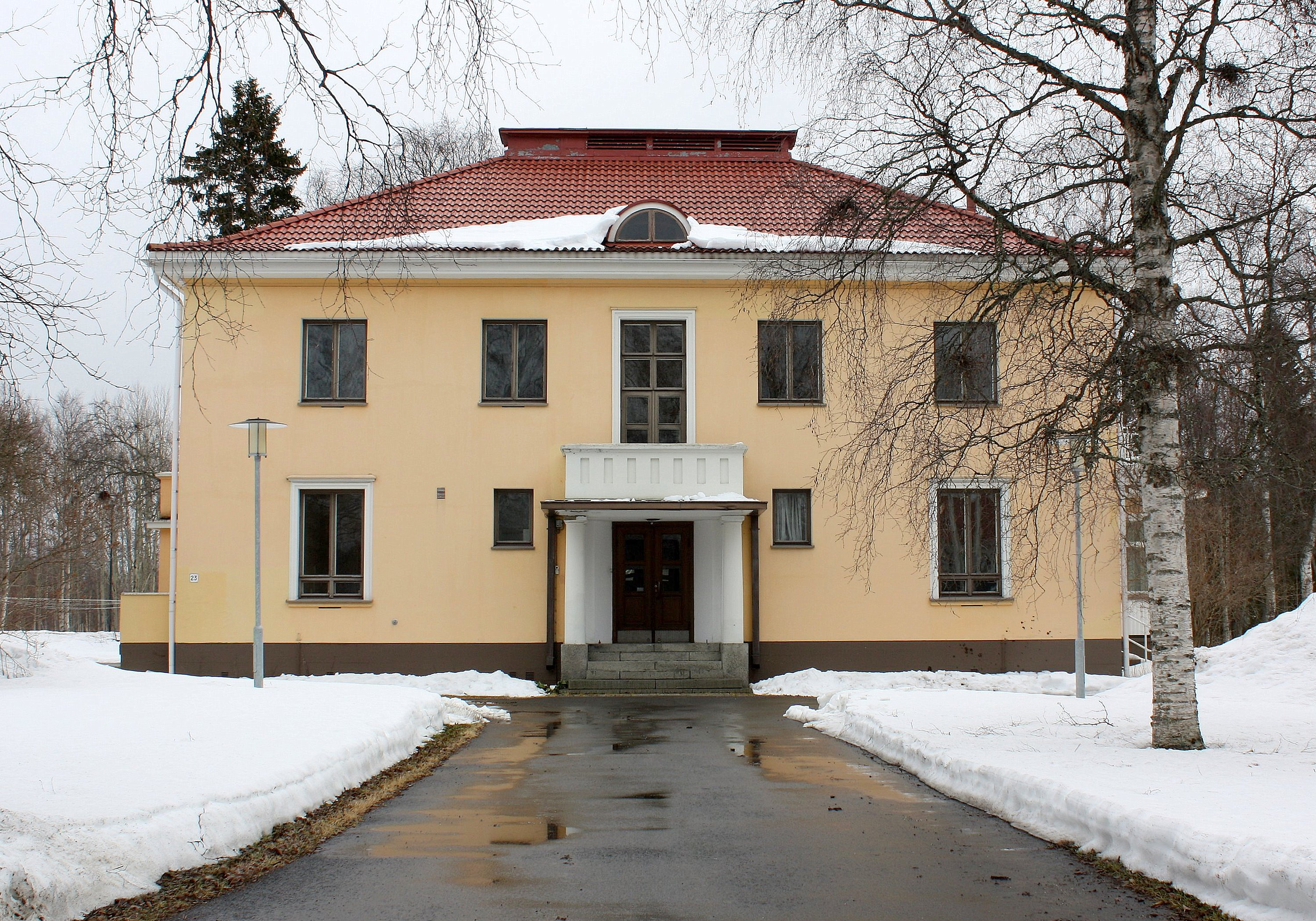
Kontula — sawmill director's residence in Kemi

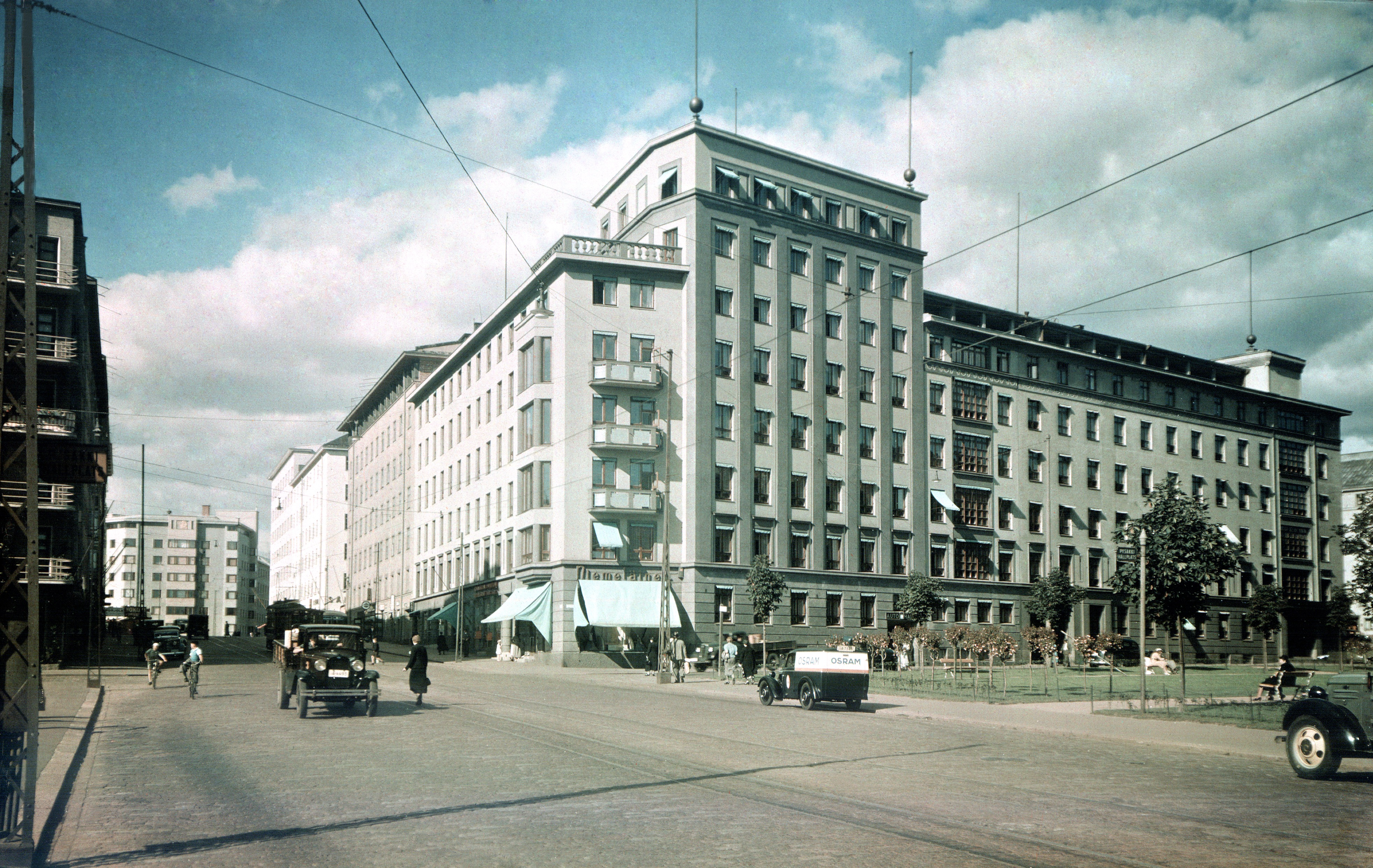
Mehiläinen Hospital in Helsinki

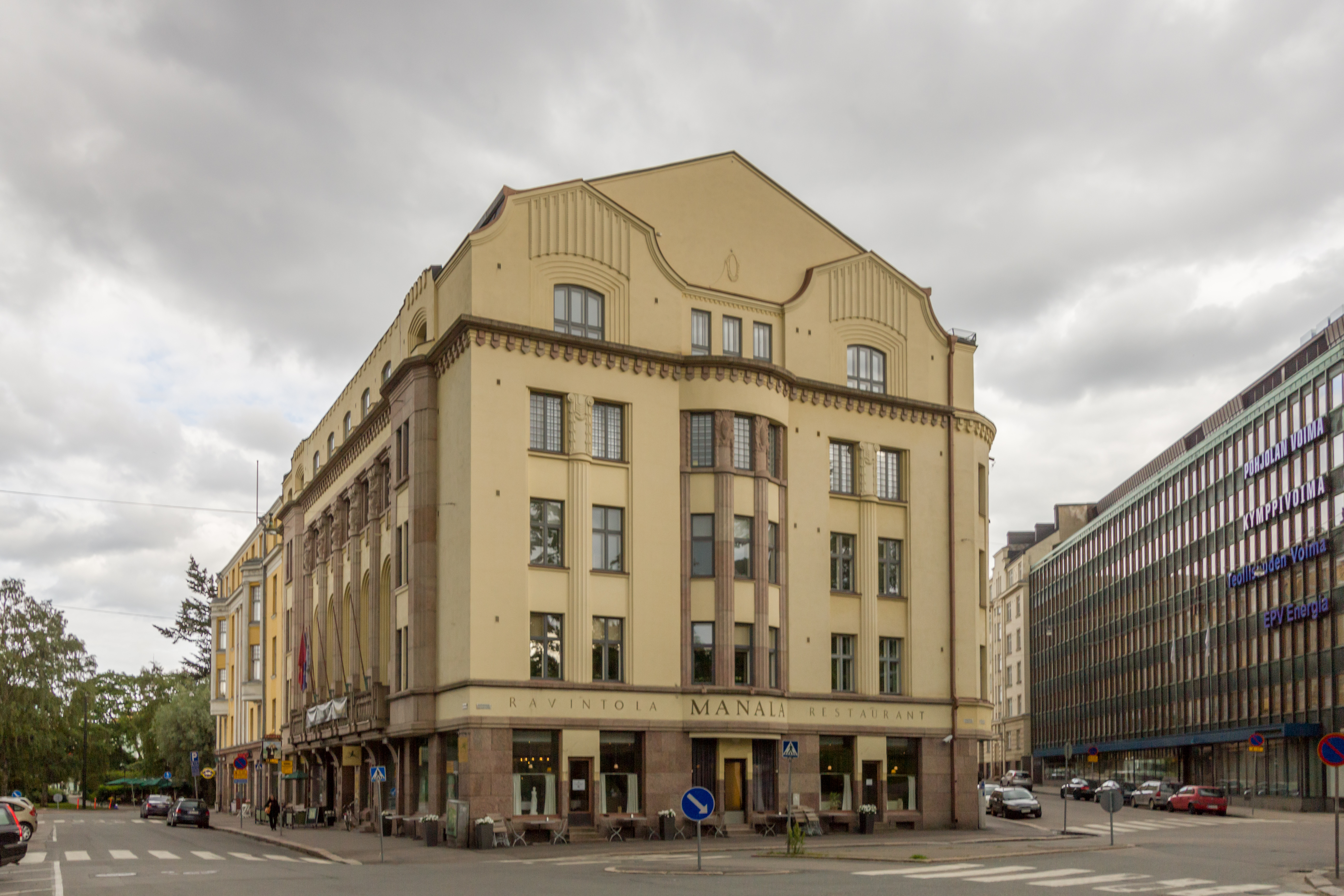
Ostrobotnia Nation House in Helsinki
