= Kulttuurikasarmi =

Coordinates: 60°10′11.73″N 24°56′7.92″E

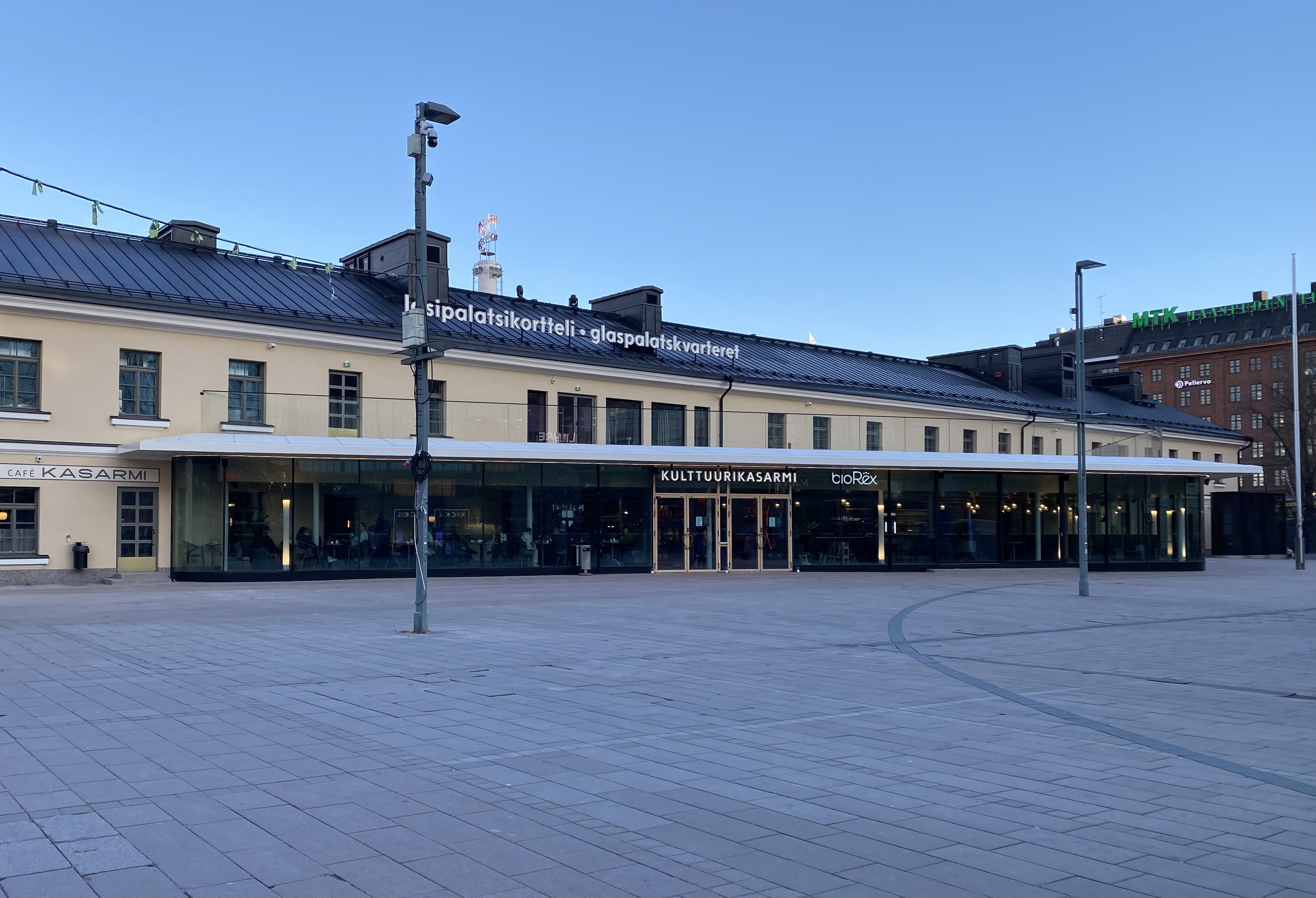
Kulttuurikasarmi on its opening day on 17 November 2023.

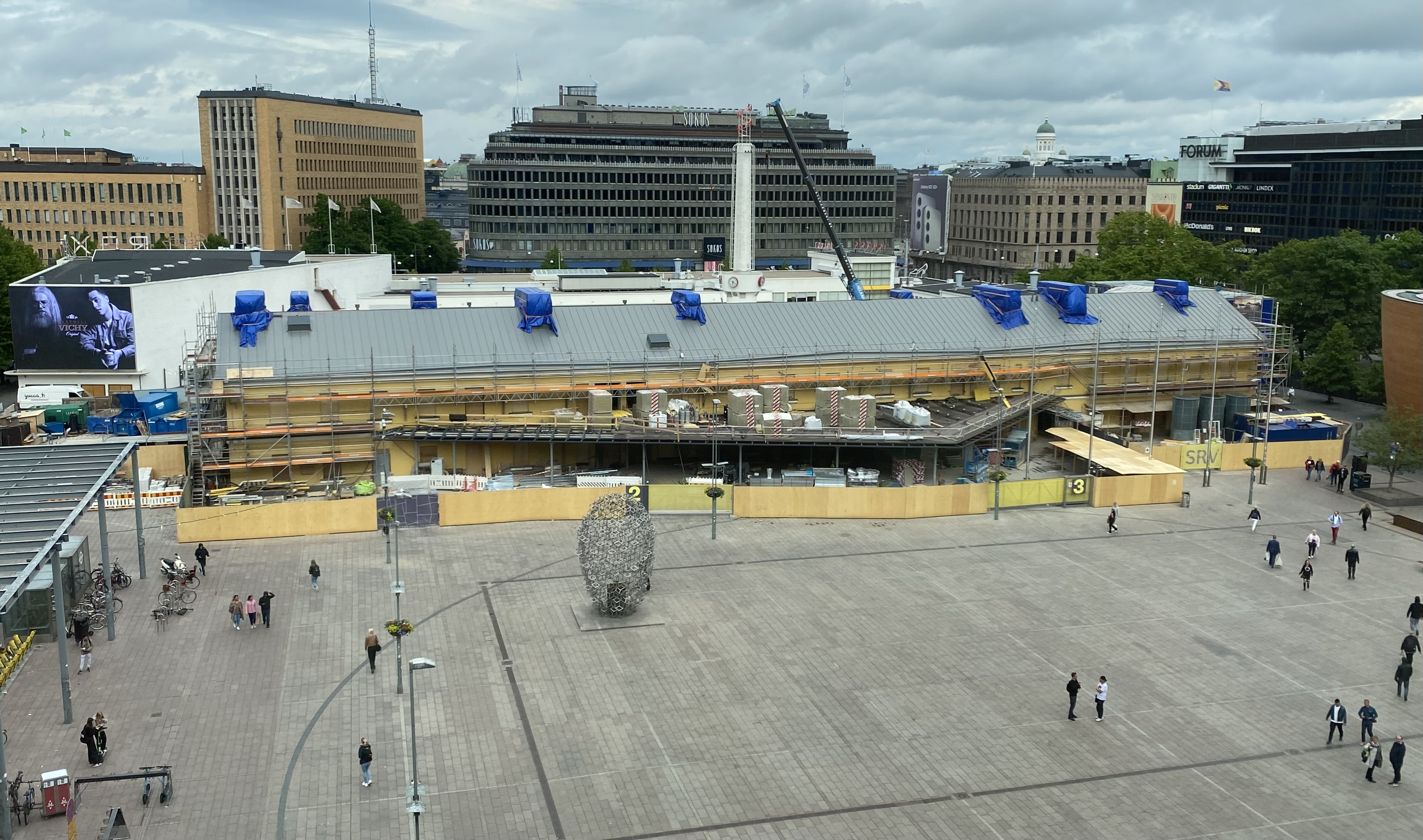
Kulttuurikasarmi under construction in June 2023.

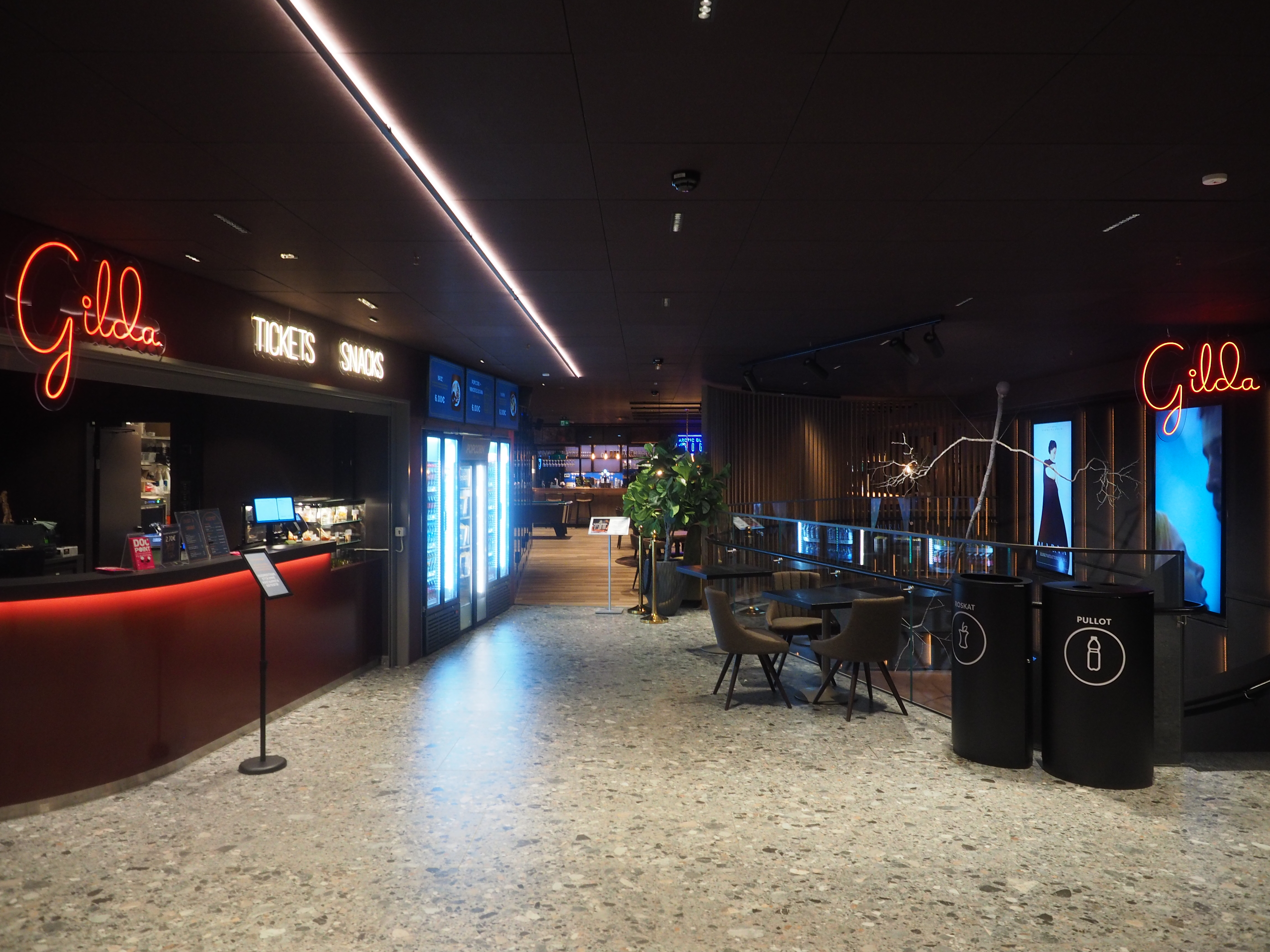
Interior of Kulttuurikasarmi.

Kulttuurikasarmi (Finnish for "Culture Barracks") is an entertainment and event centre located in Kamppi, Helsinki, Finland. It was built into the former economic building of the Turku barracks located on the edge of the Narinkkatori square. From 1935 to 2005 the building served as Helsinki's central bus station. The old building has been expanded with a glass extension with a restaurant and a bar on the Narinkkatori side, and there are three cinema auditoriums on the basement floor of the building. Kulttuurikasarmi was opened on 17 November 2023.

The project cost about 35 million euro, most of which was paid by the Finland-Swedish Konstsamfundet foundation which owns the nearby Amos Rex art museum. The building was built by SRV-yhtiöt and it was designed by the architecture bureau Arkkitehtitoimisto Sarc with Sarlotta Narjus as the main designer. The limited company Kulttuurikasarmi Oy was founded to take care of the project.

The cinema was operated by the Bio Rex chain for almost a year, but in September 2024 Bio rex announced it would withdraw from the operation because of low viewer numbers. The distributor Atlantic Film joined the Kulttuurikasarmi company as a shareholder to replace Bio Rex. In November 2024 the new cinema Gilda was opened in the premises of Kulttuurikasarmi.

== History of the building ==
The building that currently houses Kulttuurikasarmi was built in the 1830s as the economic building of the Turku barracks located next to it, at the place of the current Lasipalatsi building. The barracks proper was destroyed in the Finnish Civil War when Helsinki was being seized on 12 April 1918, but the economic building remained standing. It hosted the Uusimaa dragoon regiment from 1918 to 1921, and a "Rakuuna" plaque designed by Jari Männistö on the wall of the building commemorates this even today.

The building later served as the central bus station in Helsinki from 1935, until the Kamppi Center with its new bus station was completed in 2005. From 1935 to 2005 the departure platforms for long-distance traffic were located on the square between the bus station building and Lasipalatsi, while the arrival platform was located at the edge of the Narinkkatori square to the west of the building. The departure platforms for local traffic were located at the site of the current Kamppi Center building.

After the Kamppi Center was completed, the old economic building has hosted the Laituri exhibition of the Helsinki city planning bureau as well as the Walkers youth café. The building was renovated to serve as a cultural centre from 2021 to 2023 on the initiative of the investor Ari Tolppanen.
