= Narinkka =

Square in Helsinki, Finland

Coordinates: 60°10.18′N 24°56.09′E

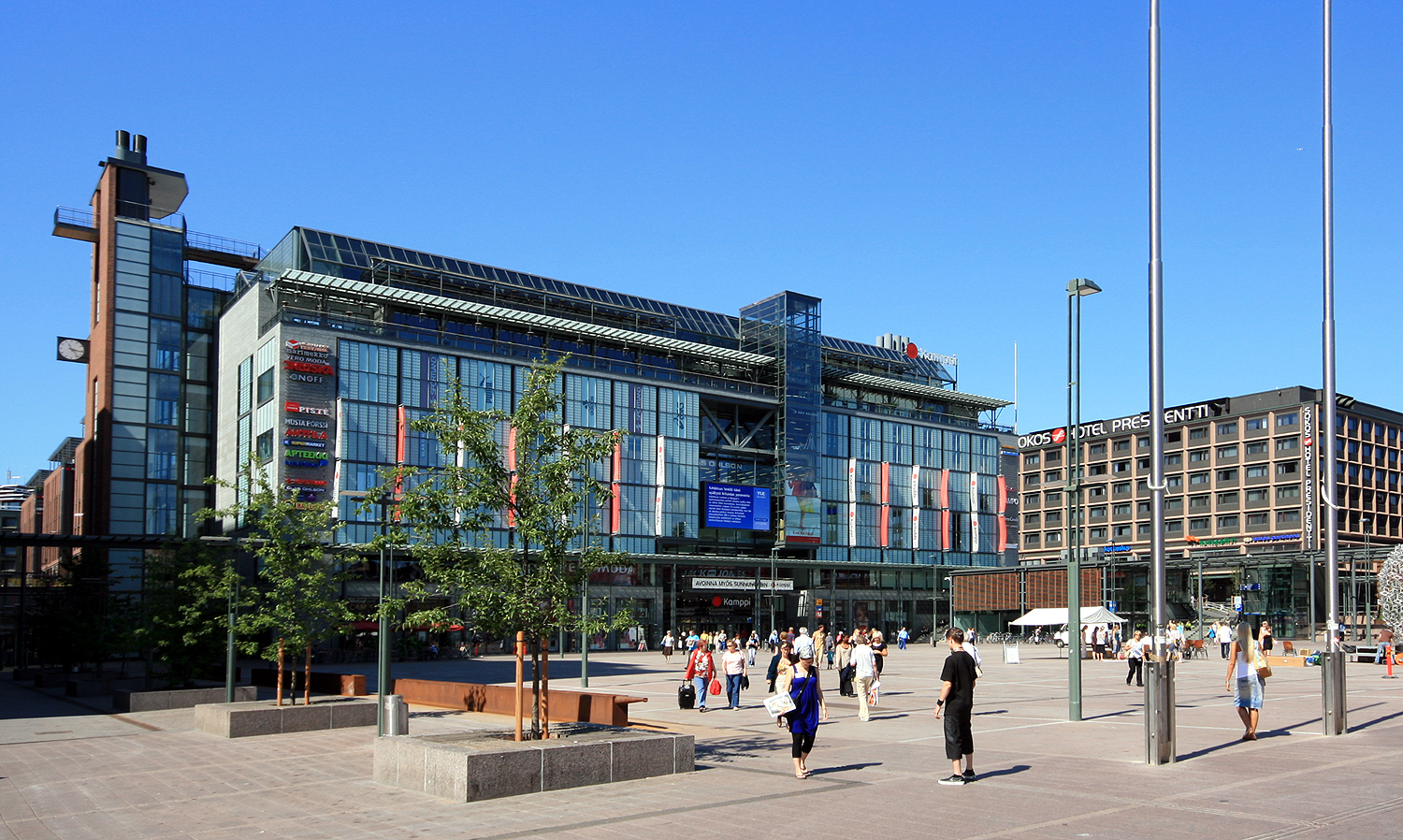
The Narinkka square. In the background are the Kamppi Center and the Sokos Hotel Presidentti.

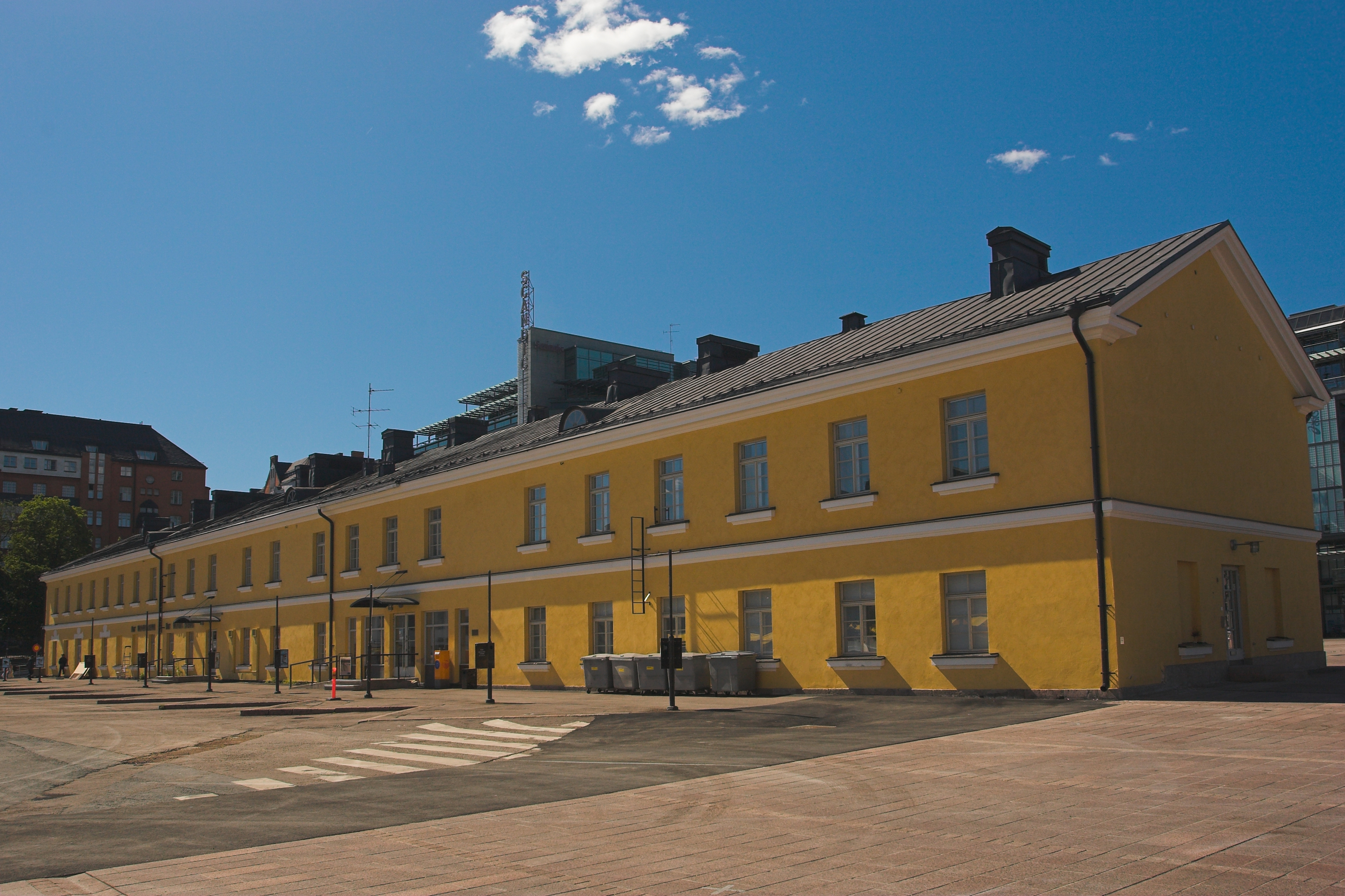
The financial building of the former Turku barracks, later a bus station, at the eastern edge of the Narinkka square.

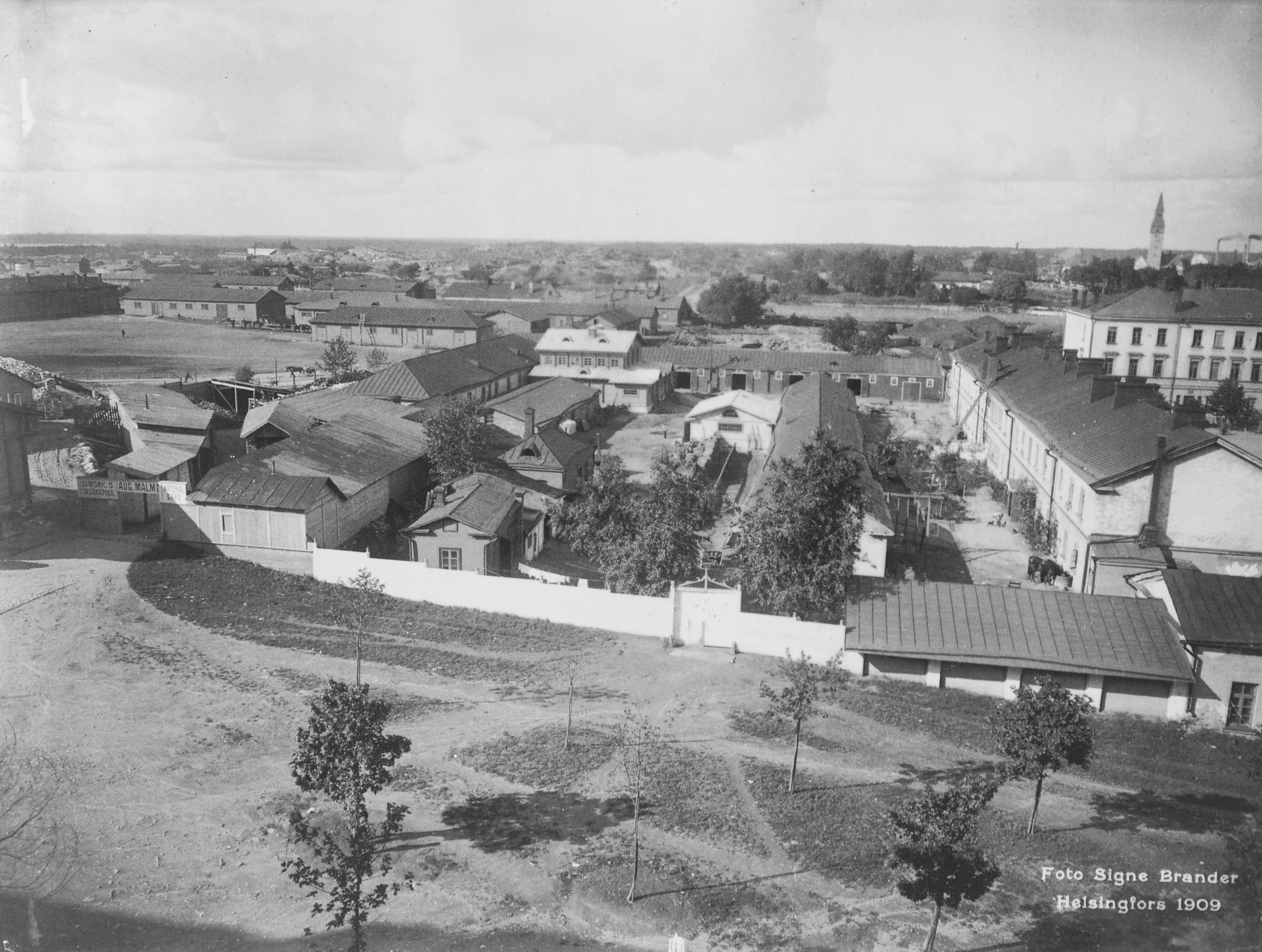
Side buildings and exercise field of the Turku barracks, at the site of the current Narinkka square, photographed in 1909 by Signe Brander.

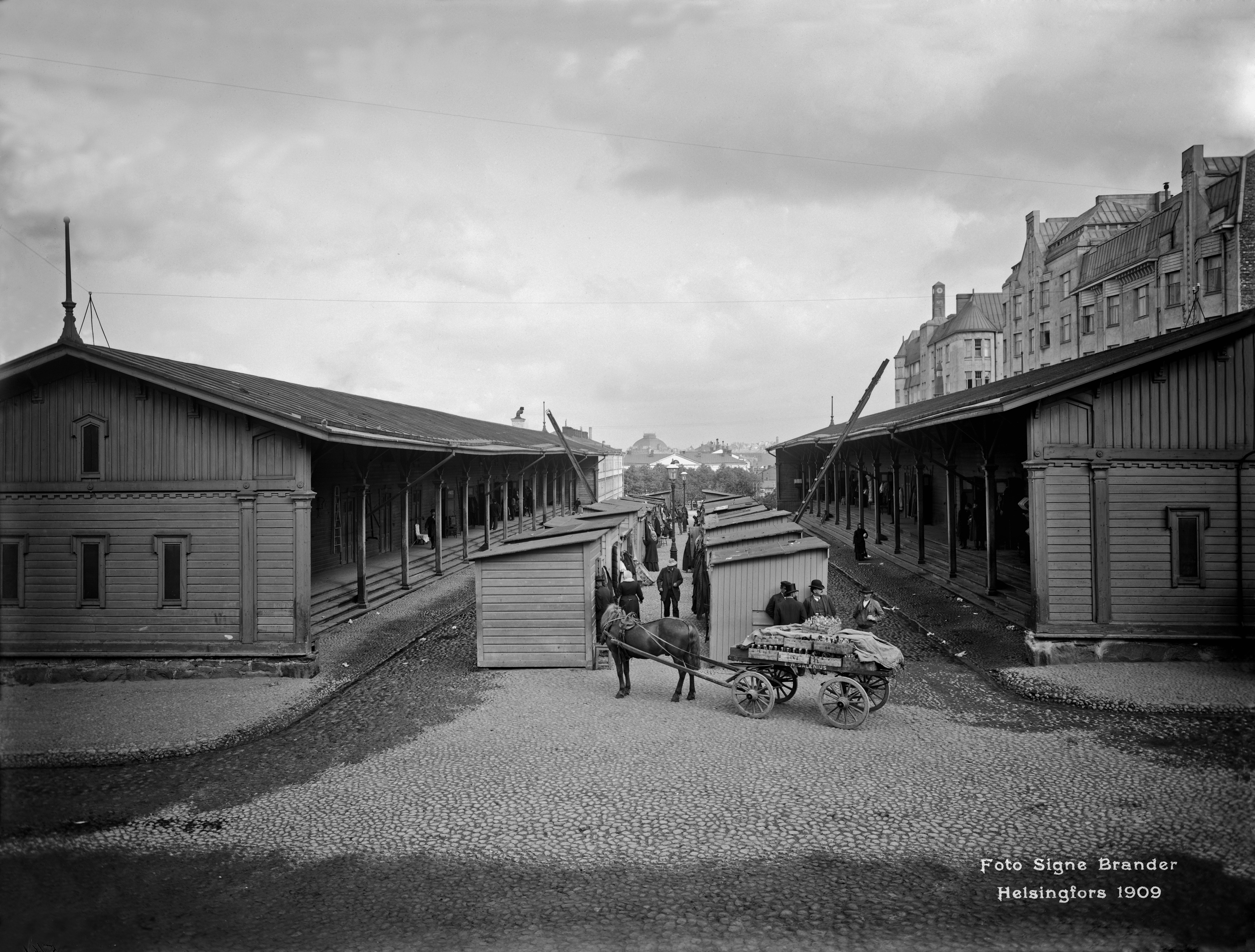
The former Narinkka along Simonkatu photographed in 1909 by Signe Brander.

Narinkka or Narinkkatori (Swedish: Narinken) is a square in Kamppi, Helsinki, Finland. It is surrounded by the Kamppi Center to the west, the former financial building of the Turku barracks to the east and the Scandic Hotels hotel Simonkenttä to the south. To the north the square borders the Salomonkatu street, which is nowadays a pedestrian zone, to the south between the square and the Simonkatu street is the Kamppi Chapel (the Silence Chapel). The square got its current form during the construction of the Kamppi Center and was built in 2005, when it also got its name.

The square has held public events such as various exhibitions, sports competitions and outdoor concerts, including the Eurovillage event related to the 2007 Eurovision Song Contest in Helsinki. The 2006 sculpture Yrittäjäveistos (Leverty) by Eva Löfdahl, which was raised to honour the Finnish entrepreneurs, is located at the square.

== History ==
The site of Narinkka originally held courtyard buildings of the Turku barracks and an exercise field for the Russian military in the barracks. The Turku barracks was destroyed in the Finnish Civil War in 1918, and the Lasipalatsi building was built in its place. The financial building of the barracks remains, and it has hosted the central bus station of Helsinki from 1935 to 2005, when the bus station was moved underground in connection to the Kamppi Center. The platforms for long-distance traffic were on a square between the bus station and Lasipalatsi, at the site of the current Narinkka square were the platforms for incoming traffic and platforms for buses to northern Espoo and western Vantaa. The former bus station building currently hosts restaurants and the urban planning exhibition Laituri.

=== Former Narinkka ===
Narinkka got its name from a market square located from 1876 to 1929 along Simonkatu, at the site of the current Scandic Hotel Simonkenttä, where the Finnish Jews and Finnish Russians sold used clothes. The name comes from the Russian words "на рынке" (literally "at the market square"). A marketplace for used clothes of this kind had already been present in Helsinki since the 18th century, originally at the site of the current main military outpost in Helsinki, later at the lot of the Bank of Finland, where it was moved to Kamppi, when the main building of the Bank of Finland was built.

There later was a terminus stop Simonkenttä fort buses travelling to Haaga and Konala. Because of steep height differences in the terrain, a cliff face separated it from the long-distance bus terminal at the site of the current Narinkka square. A hotel building stands in its place today.

The name Narinkka is in use also as an annual book series published by the Helsinki City Museum.
