= Turku barracks =

Coordinates: 60°10′11.72″N 24°56′8.41″E

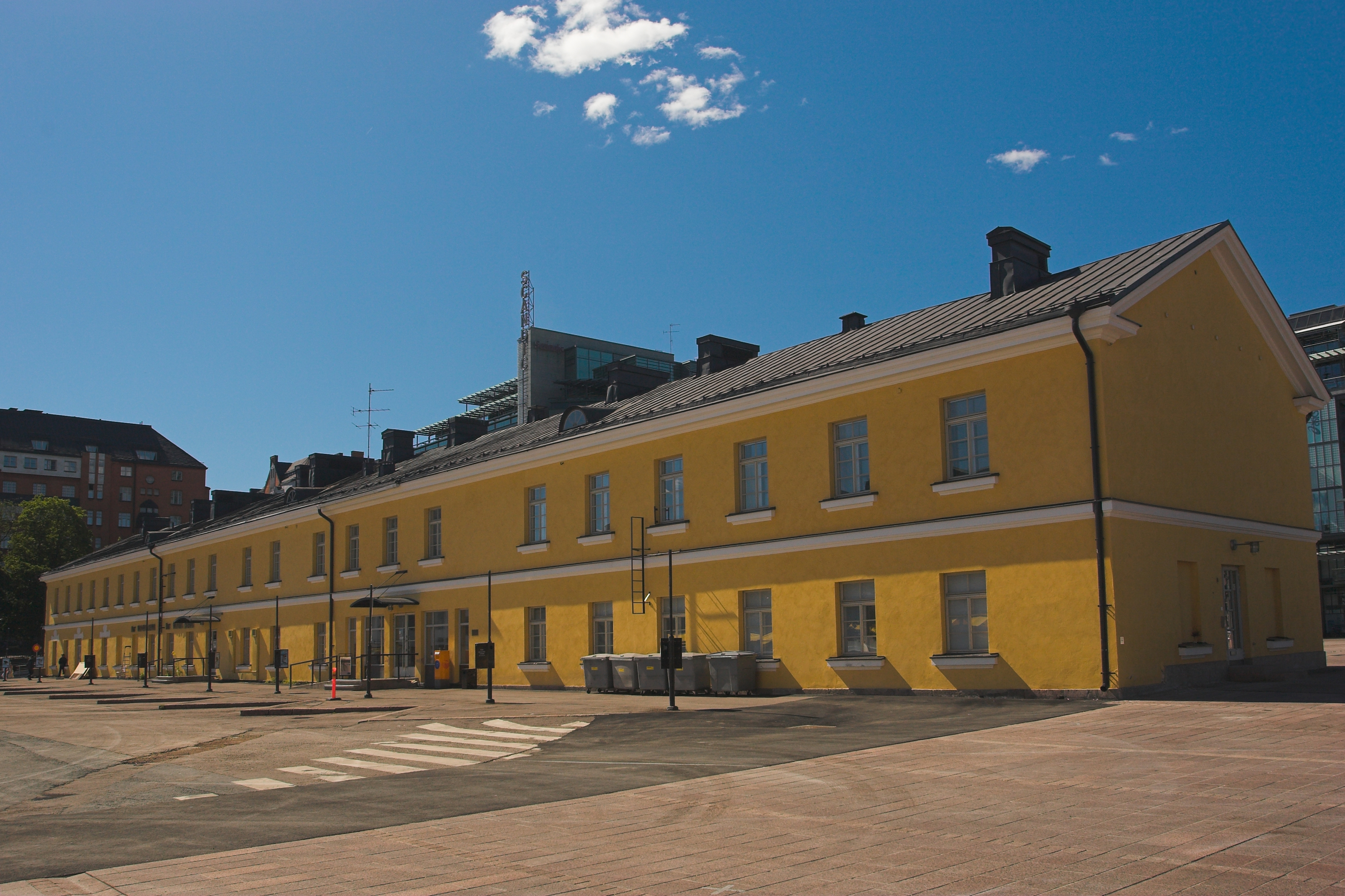
The Turku barracks' auxiliary building is the only remaining building in the complex. It served as Helsinki's main bus station in 1935-2005 and since 2023 as the Cultural Barracks.

The Turku barracks was a barracks building for the military of Russia built in 1833 in Kamppi, Helsinki, Finland, along the street Läntinen Henrikinkatu (now known as Mannerheimintie).

== Before construction ==
The Kamppi area had already been used under Swedish rule as a camping and practice area for the military, known as Campementsplats, where the name Kamppi comes from. The area was later used by the Finnish Guard until it was taken into use by the Russian military settled in Helsinki.

== Construction ==
The Turku barracks was constructed from 1830 to 1833 at the site of the current Lasipalatsi building, which was at the edge of the city proper at the time, near the Espoo toll station, which was the start of a highway leading to Turku. Before that, the Russian military in Helsinki had been mainly stationed in the Merikasarmi building in Katajanokka, which then was transferred to the use of the navy of the Military of the Grand Duchy of Finland.

The original plans for the barracks were made by Carl Ludvig Engel, but it was built on a commission from Nikolai Sinebrychoff. A number of side buildings were built on the west and southwest sides of the main building, and a large exercise field was built between them, at the site of the current Narinkka square.

== Destruction and subsequent use ==
During the Finnish Civil War, in connection of the conquest of Helsinki on 12 April 1918, the Turku barracks caught fire and was almost completely destroyed. It was not rebuilt, but instead dismantling started the next year, even though some of the ruins remained up to the 1930s. The barracks' former exercise field was used as a sports field and a skating rink during the 1930s.

The remaining side buildings near the barracks were in use by the Finnish Defence Forces in the 1920s, housing the Uusimaa Dragoon Regiment, the command company and the Field Artillery Regiment 1. The Finnish state donated the Turku barracks to the city of Helsinki in an exchange in 1934. The next year, after it had been destroyed, the Lasipalatsi building, originally intended as a temporary building, was built in its place. Some of the last buildings in the complex were demolished as late as the 1950s. Nowadays, only the auxiliary building west of the main building remains. Up to the completion of the Kamppi Center in 2005 this building served as Helsinki's main bus station, after which it was in use as the City of Helsinki planning office's exhibition space called Laituri, which operated in the building until 2018. The entire building was gutted in 2021, retaining only the outer walls, in order to build the Culture Barracks, which opened in November 2023. Following the remodelling, designed by Sarc Architects, the building houses three cinema auditoriums (all underground), as well as various restaurants, an outdoor terrace and an events space. The west side of the building has been supplemented with a wide glazed extension.
