= Lasipalatsi =

Office building in Helsinki, Finland

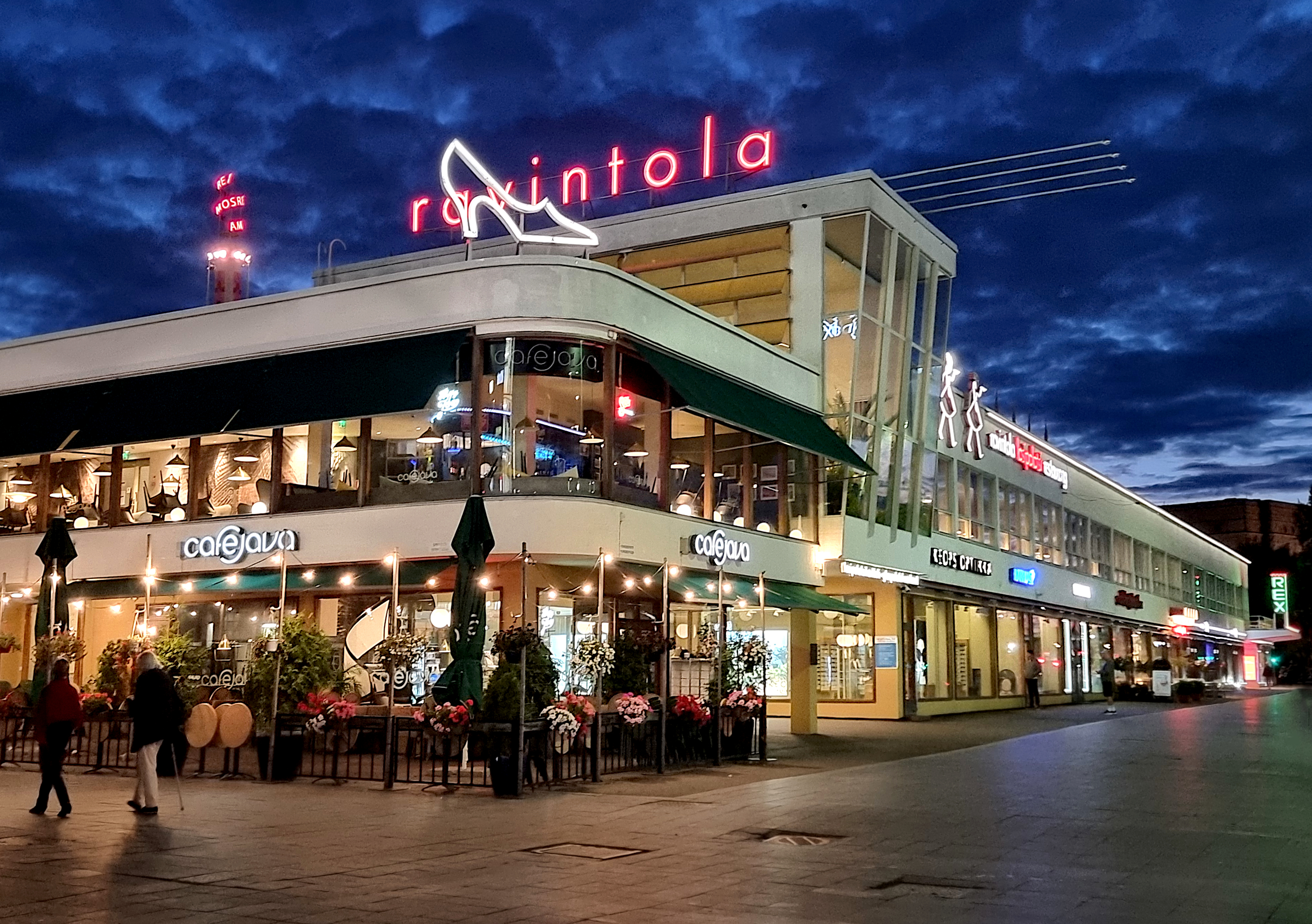
- Interactive map of the Lasipalatsi area

General information
- Architectural style: Functionalism
- Location: Helsinki, Finland
- Coordinates: 60°10′13″N 24°56′13″E
- Construction started: 1935
- Completed: 1936
- Renovated: 1998, 2016

Design and construction
- Architects: Viljo Revell, Heimo Riihimäki and Niilo Kokko

Website
- lasipalatsi.fi

Lasipalatsi (Swedish: Glaspalatset; meaning literally "glass palace") is a functionalist office building designed in the 1930s, located on Mannerheimintie in the Kamppi district of Helsinki, Finland, next to Forum shopping centre and Kamppi Center. Lasipalatsi is one of Helsinki's most notable functionalist buildings.

== History ==
An earlier building at the same location was the Turku barracks, which was destroyed in the Finnish Civil War in 1918. Lasipalatsi, designed by three young architects Viljo Revell, Heimo Riihimäki and Niilo Kokko, was built on the same site in 1936. Lasipalatsi, containing offices, restaurants and a film theatre, was originally designed as a temporary building, later to be torn down to allow a larger office building to be constructed in its place. The Varuboden grocery, Oy Siemens AB and the HOK ice cream bar were Lasipalatsi's most prominent businesses for decades. At the time of its opening, the film theatre Bio Rex was one of the biggest film theatres in the city, and many formal premieres of Finnish films were shown there.

The original plans to tear down Lasipalatsi were postponed decade after decade, but the building also wasn't renovated, because its final fate was still left open. In the 1980s, large sheets advertising the Ale Pub underlined the shameful state of the worn building. Only when the Board of Construction set a threat fee, the Apartment Bureau renovated the building's outer walls. In summer 1985, the old grayish paint was replaced with through-coloured white mortar. Helsinkians opposed the destruction of the building several times, and the Museum Bureau also supported its protection.

After decades of deterioration, Lasipalatsi was protected and renovated into a culture and media centre in 1998, also containing cafés and many corporations in the media business. The building also hosted Internet services and exhibition halls. The Yleisradio Morning TV used to be broadcast from Lasipalatsi, and next to it was the Yle Shop. The film theatre Bio Rex is specialised in showing non-mainstream cultural films.

Lasipalatsi has been included in the selection of Finnish masterpieces of modernism in architecture by the Docomomo International organization.

The building is undergoing extensive renovations as of October 2016. A new museum, Amos Rex, has been built under the Lasipalatsi square with some parts of the museum residing in Lasipalatsi.

== Gallery ==
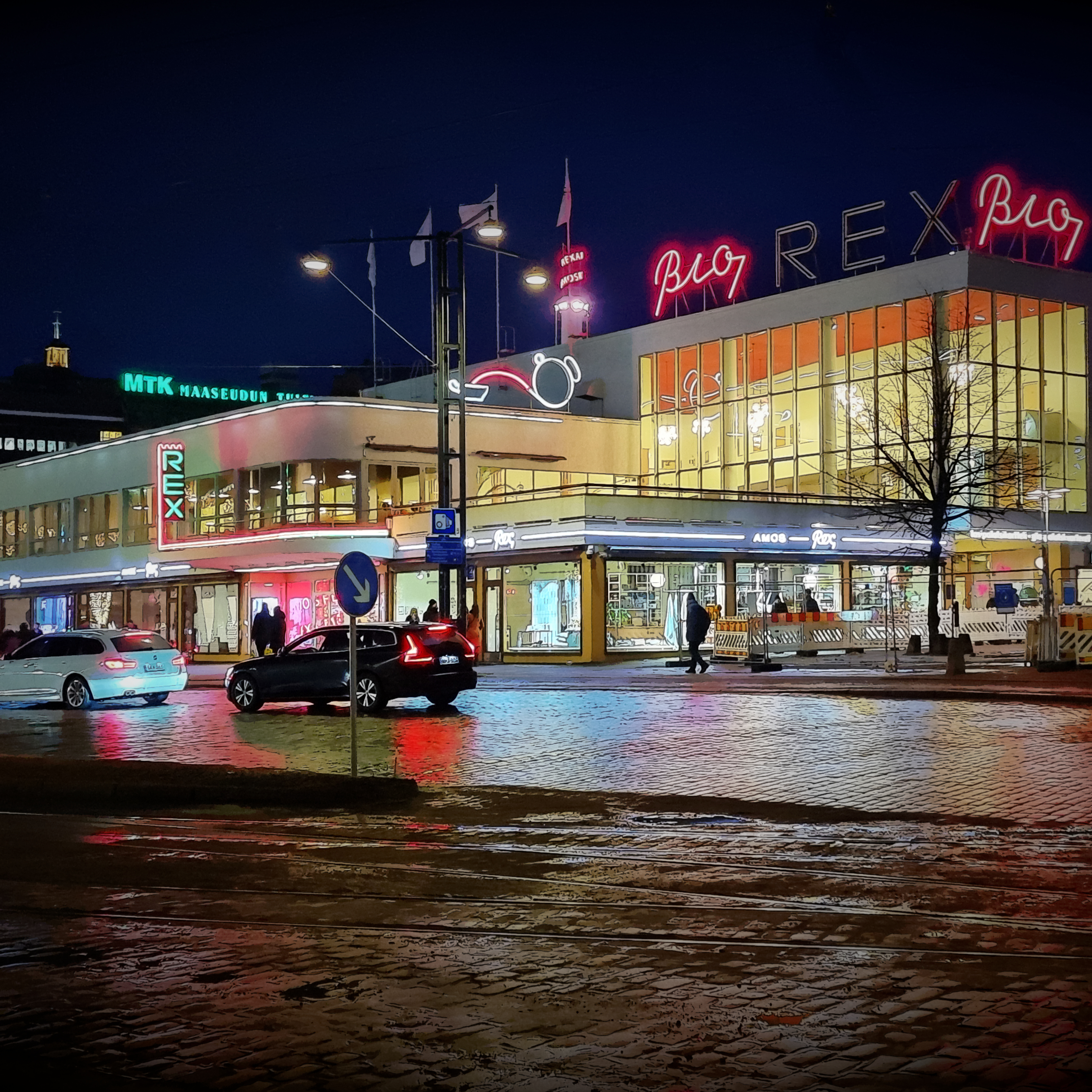
North corner.

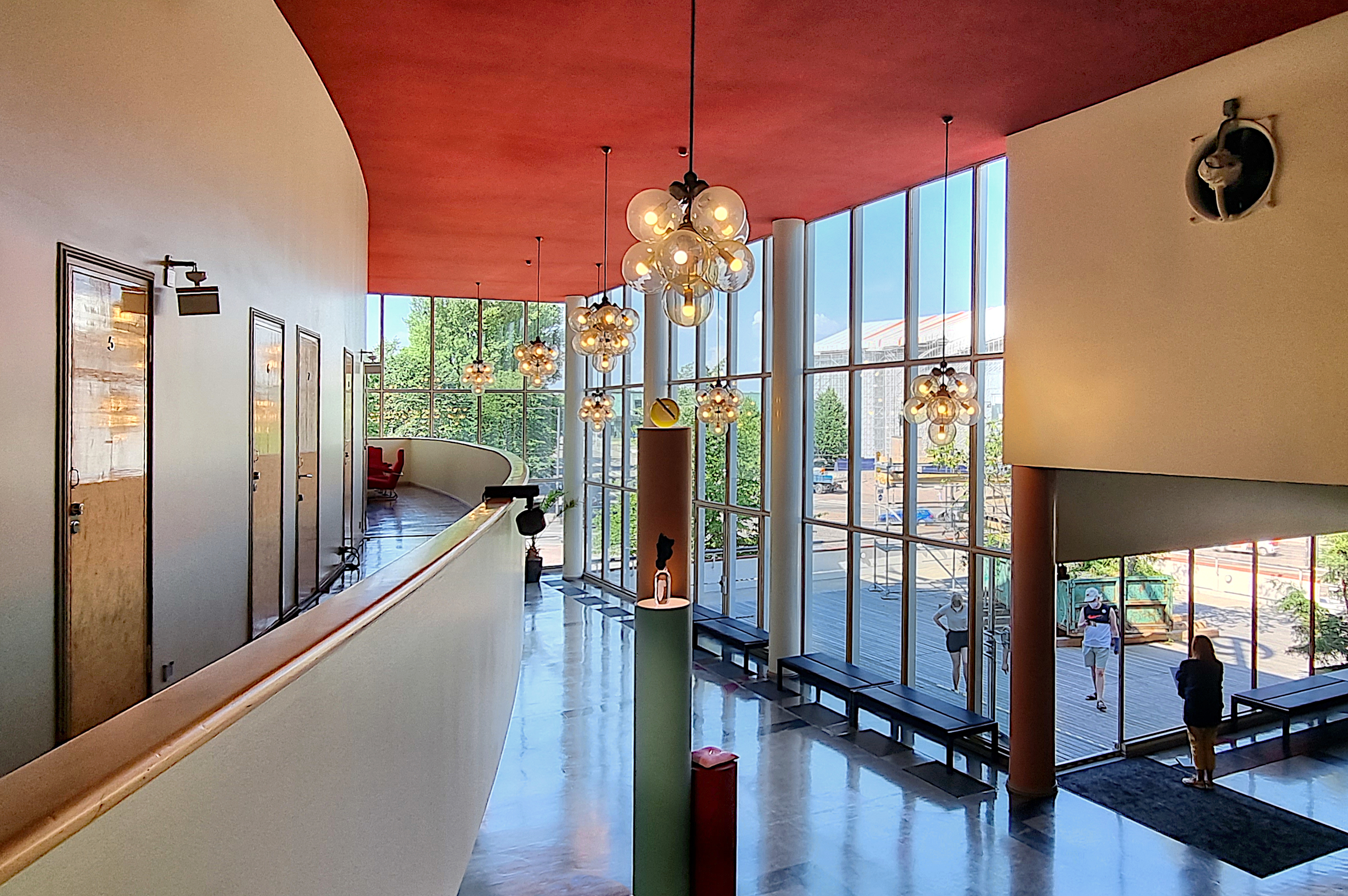
Bio Rex.

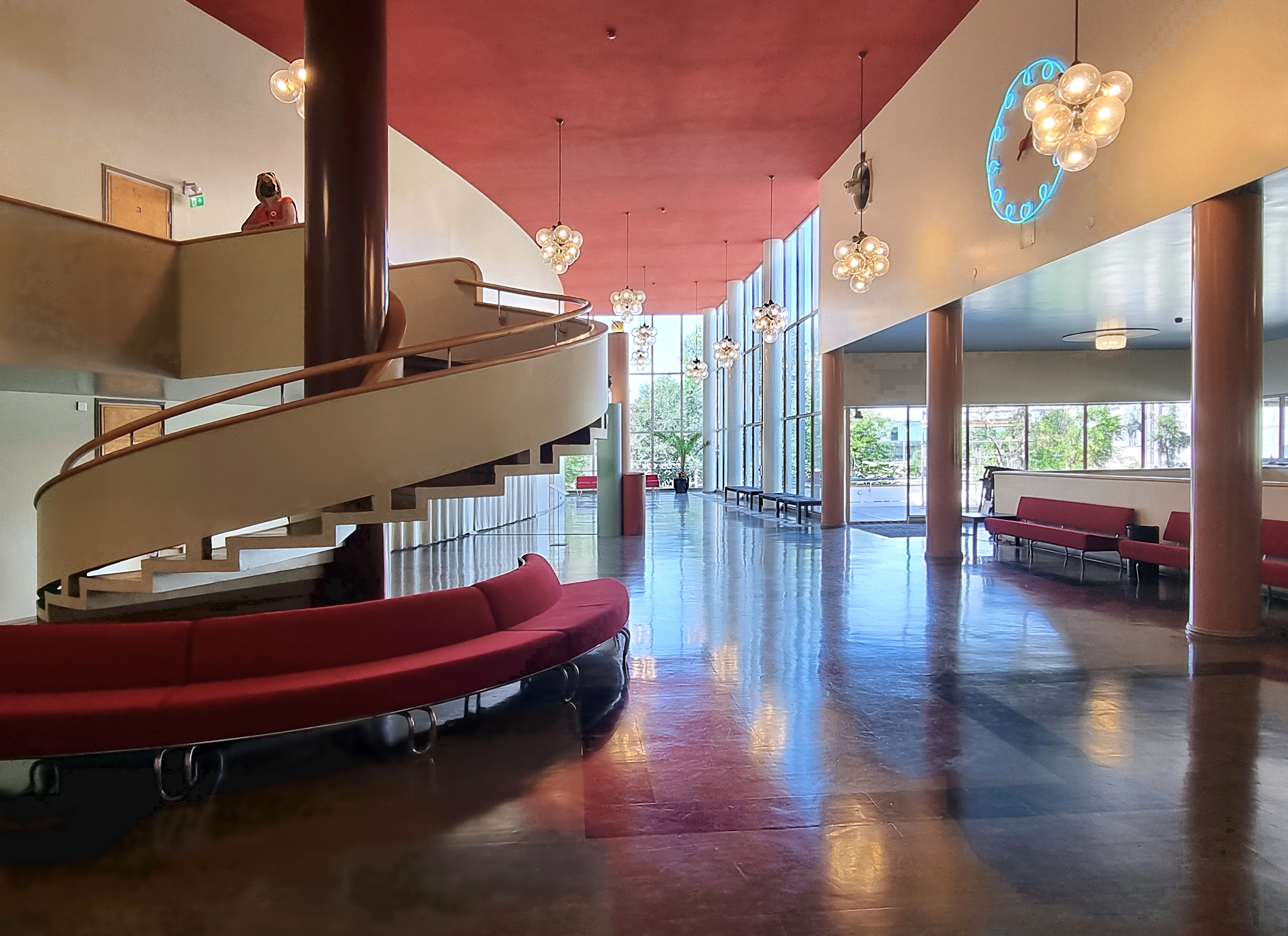
Bio Rex.

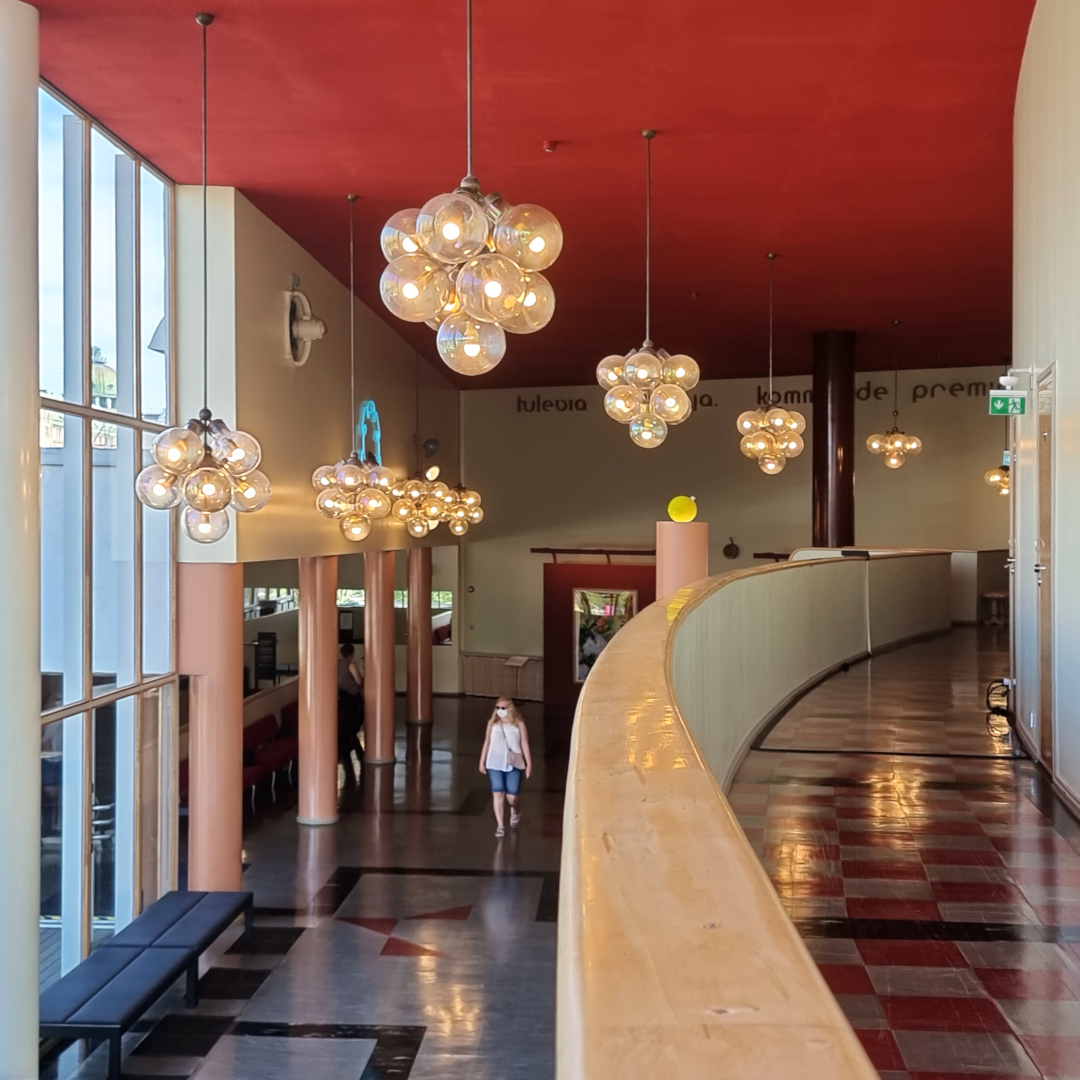
Bio Rex.

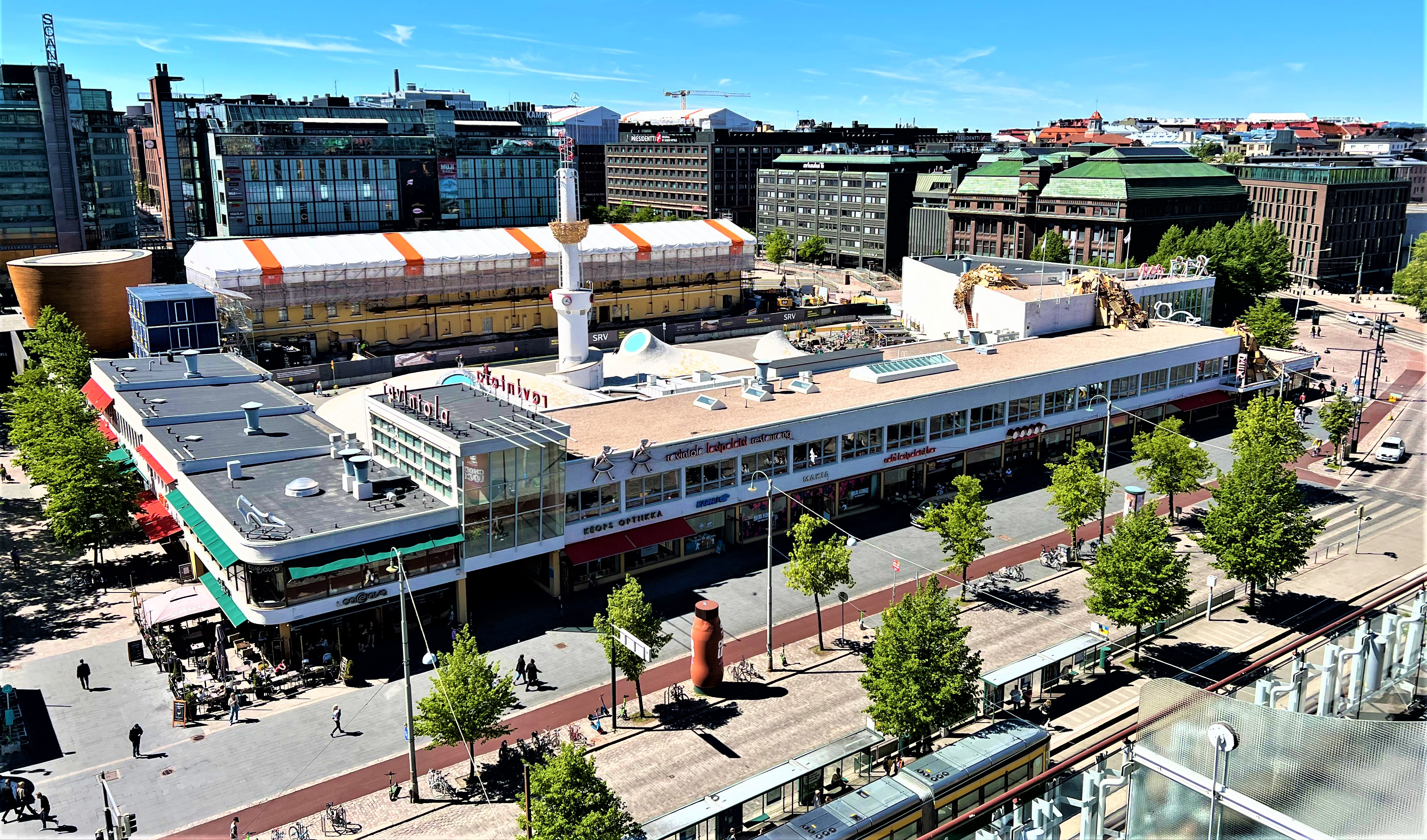
Bird's view.

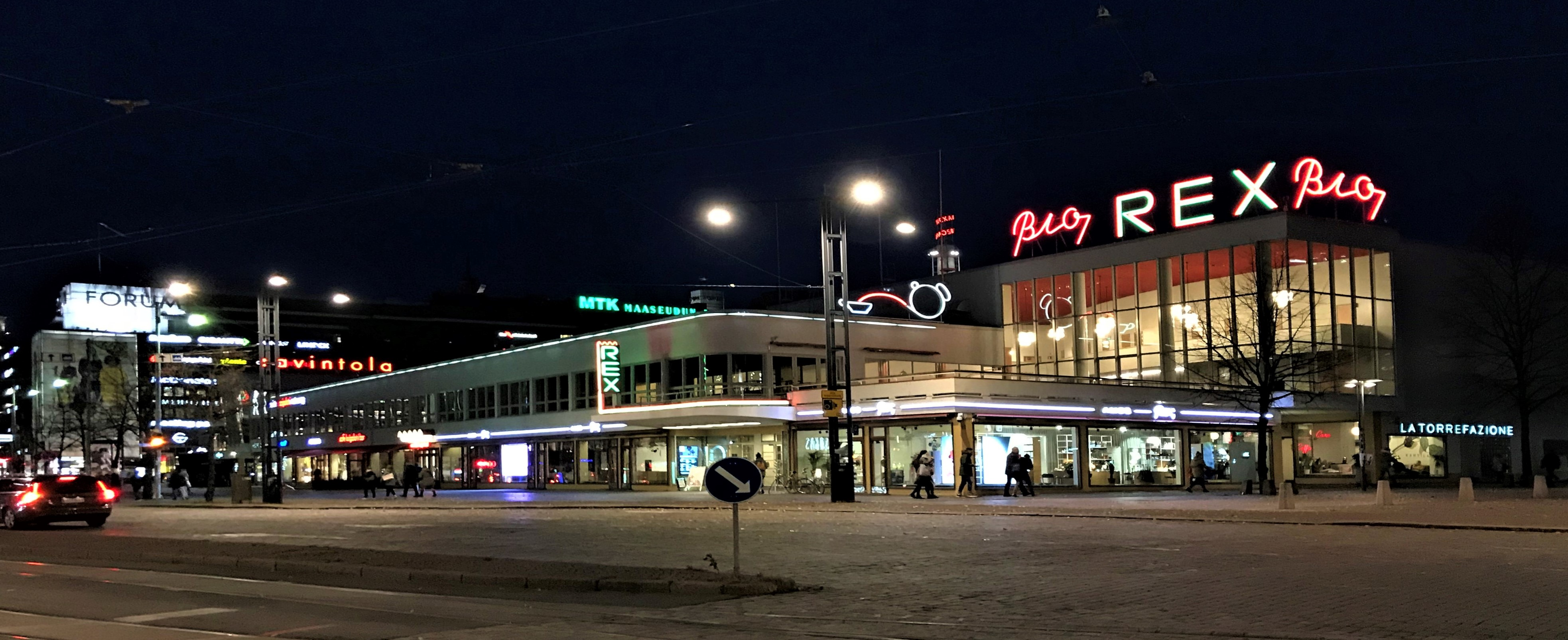

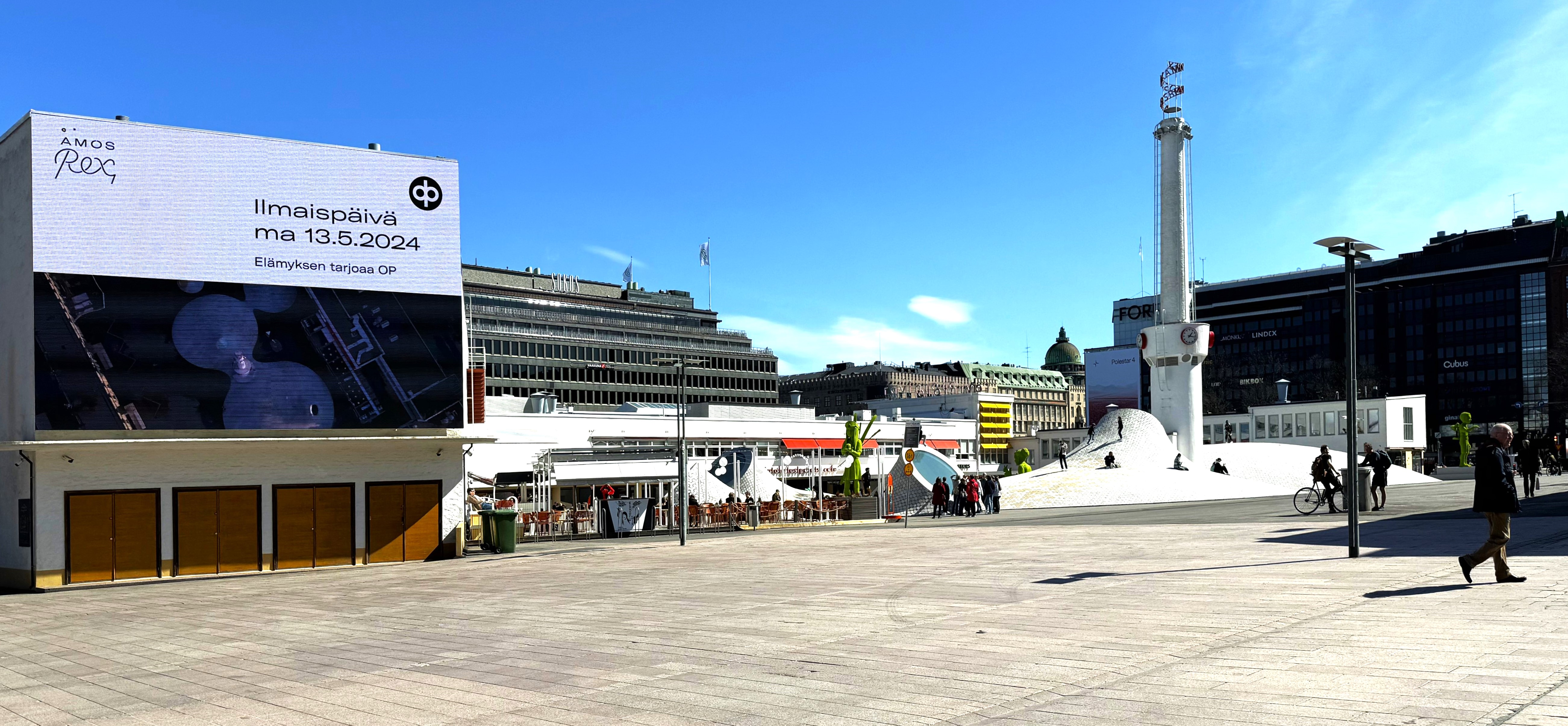
Lasipalatsi's Square and Amos Rex.

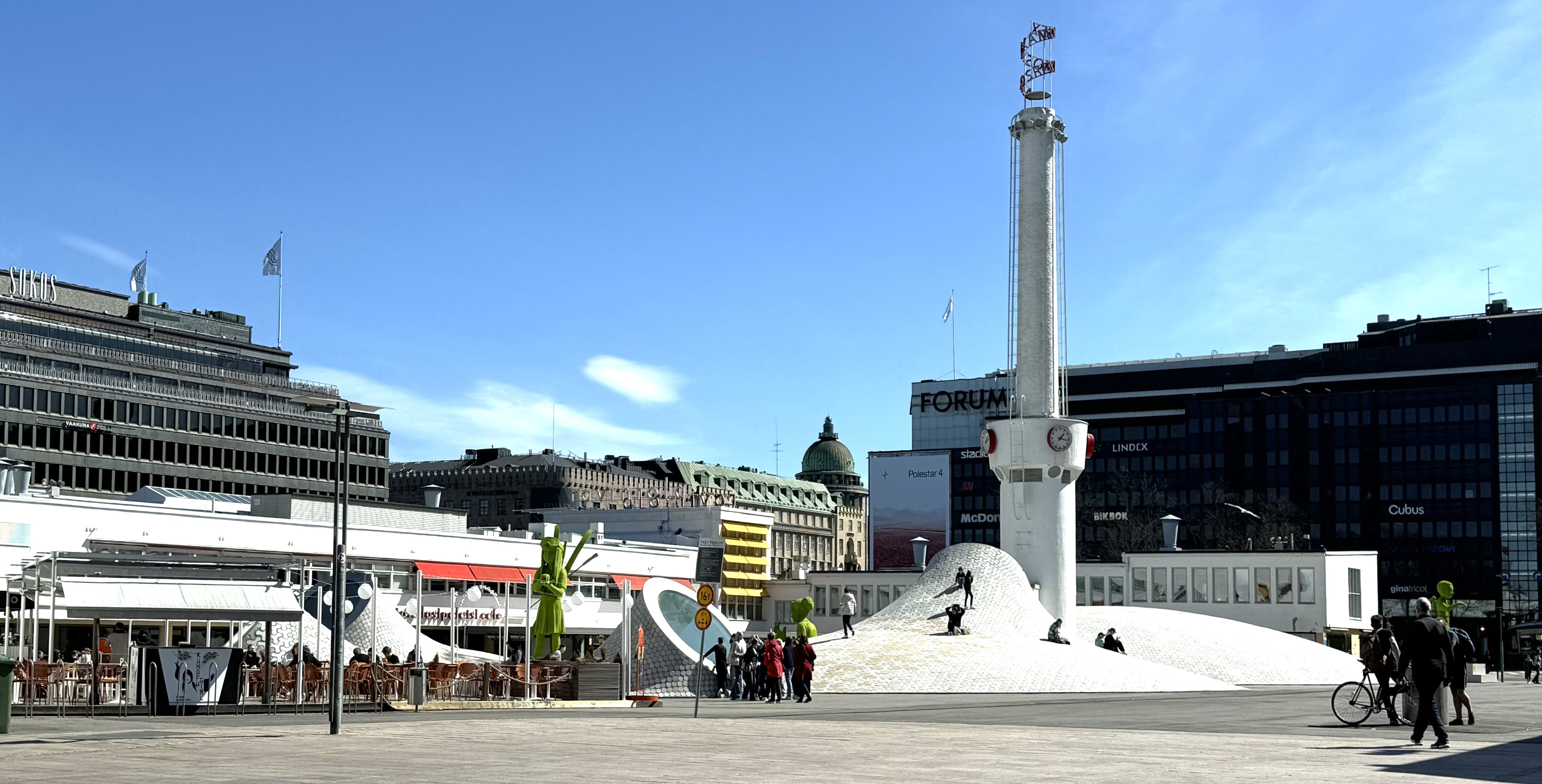
Lasipalatsi's Square and Amos Rex.

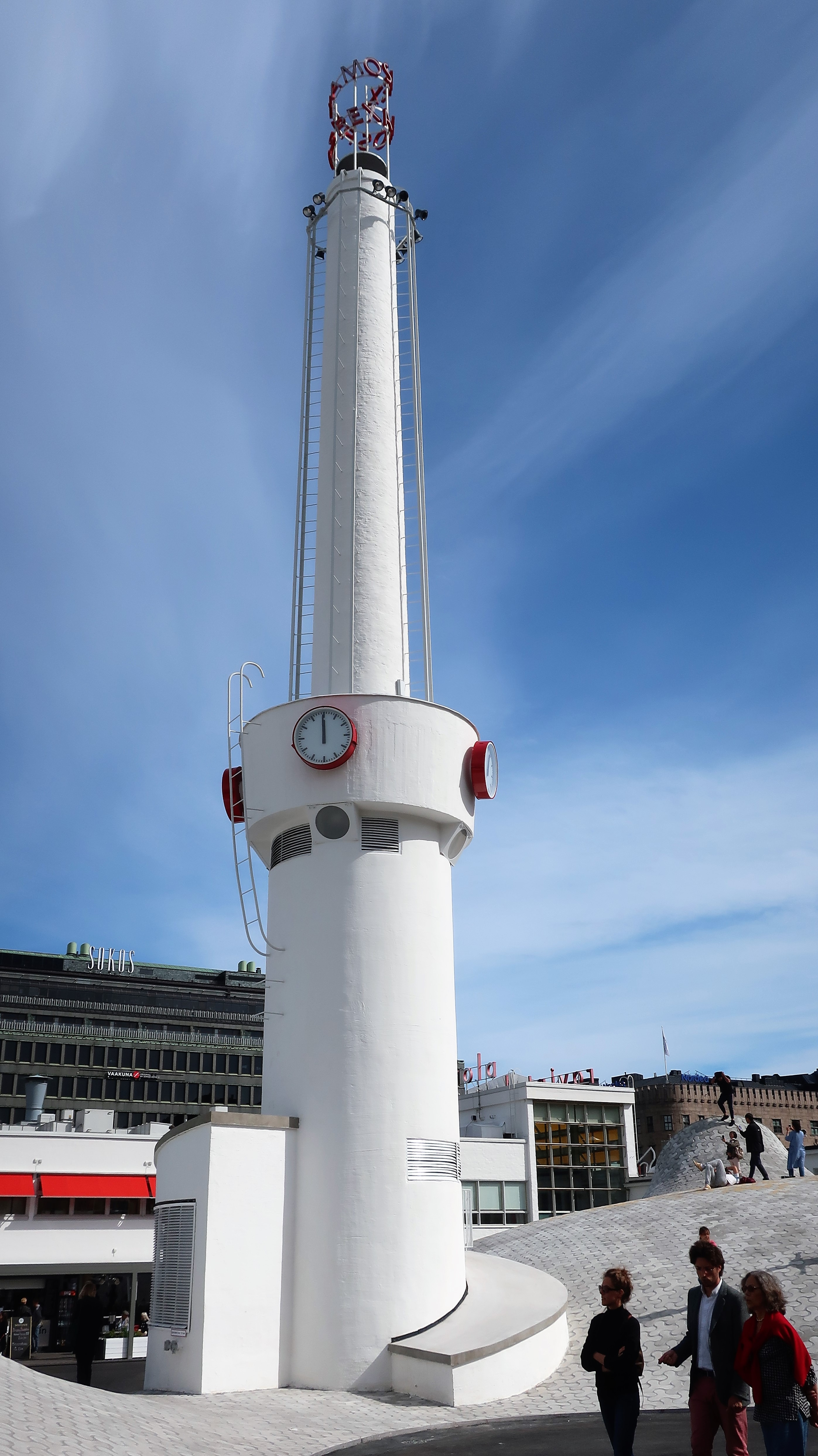
Chimney.

== See also ==
- Architecture of Finland
- Kamppi Center
- Forum Shopping Center
