= Kamppi Center =

Kamppi Centre
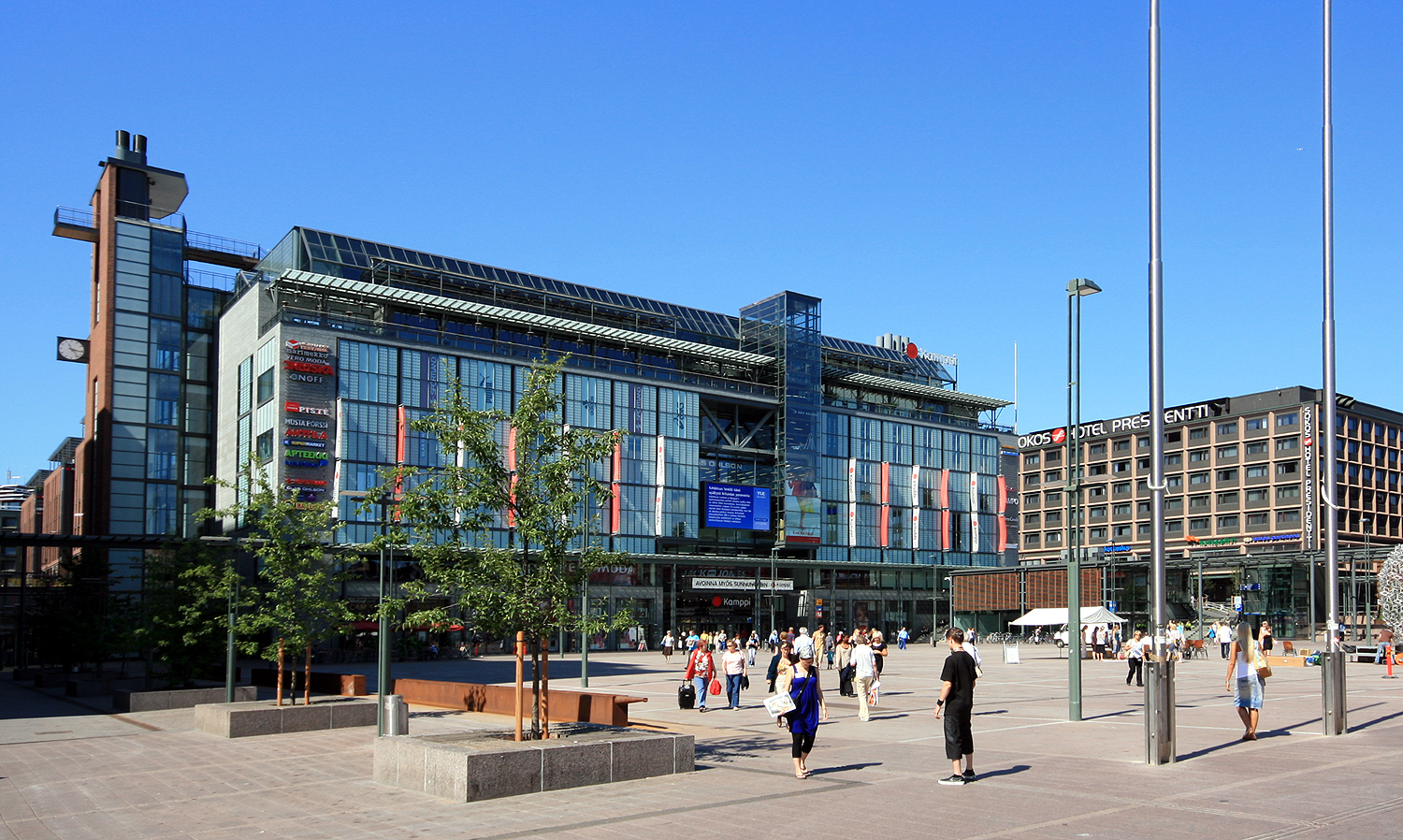
- Location: Kamppi, Helsinki, Finland
- Coordinates: 60°10′10.5″N 024°56′00.4″E
- Opened: March 2, 2006
- Manager: Tuomas Sahi
- Owner: Nordic Retail Fund
- Architect: Juhani Pallasmaa
- Floor area: 37,000 m^{2} (398,265 sq ft)
- Floors: 7
- Parking: 250 bays
- Website: www.kamppi.fi/en/ (in English)

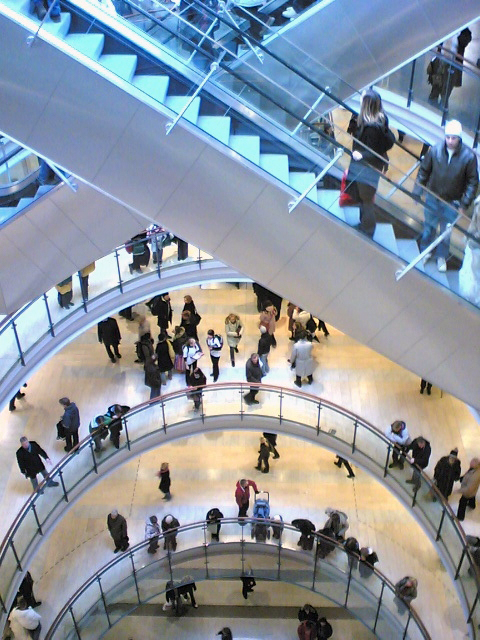
Kamppi shopping centre.

Kamppi Centre (Finnish: Kampin keskus, Swedish: Kampens centrum) is a complex in the Kamppi district in the centre of Helsinki, Finland, designed by various architects, the main designer, however, being Juhani Pallasmaa. As a four-year construction project, it was the largest singular construction site in the history of Finland, involving the extensive and difficult redevelopment of the Kamppi district in downtown Helsinki.

The Kamppi Centre consists of:

- Central bus terminal for local buses
- Long-distance coach terminal (underground)
- Kamppi metro station (underground)
- A freight depot (underground)
- Internal parking area (underground)
- 6 floor shopping centre with a supermarket, shops, restaurants, night clubs and service points
- High-class offices and residential apartments

The entire complex was opened in stages, with the new metro station entrance opened on 2 June 2005, the central bus terminal on 5 June, the long-distance bus terminal on 6 June and the shopping centre opened on 2 March 2006.

The appearance of the building is a reflection of the main architect Juhani Pallasmaa's ongoing interest in Constructivist architecture and Structuralist architecture, as if the building functions as a machine.

== Shopping centre ==
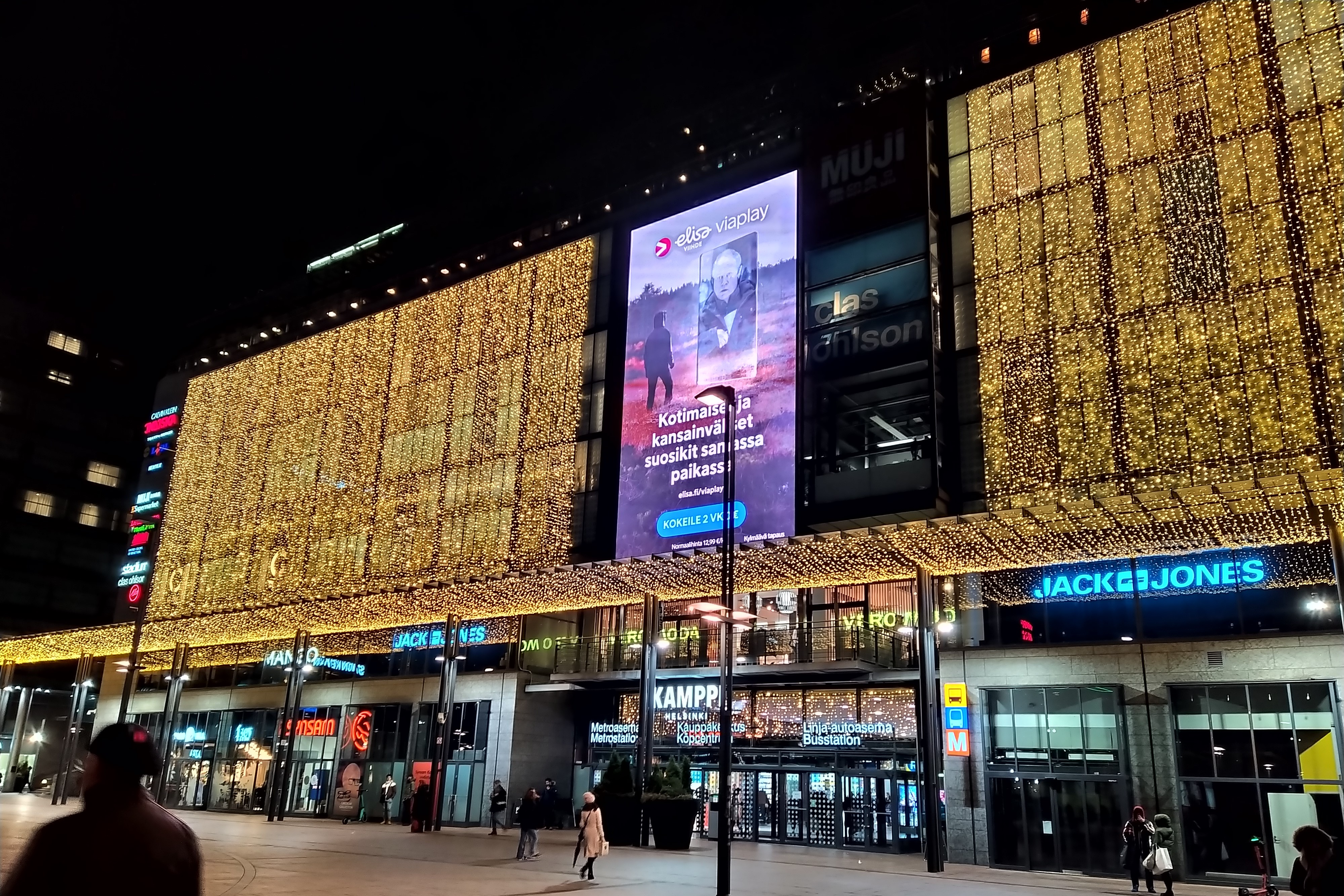
Kamppi Center in November 2021.

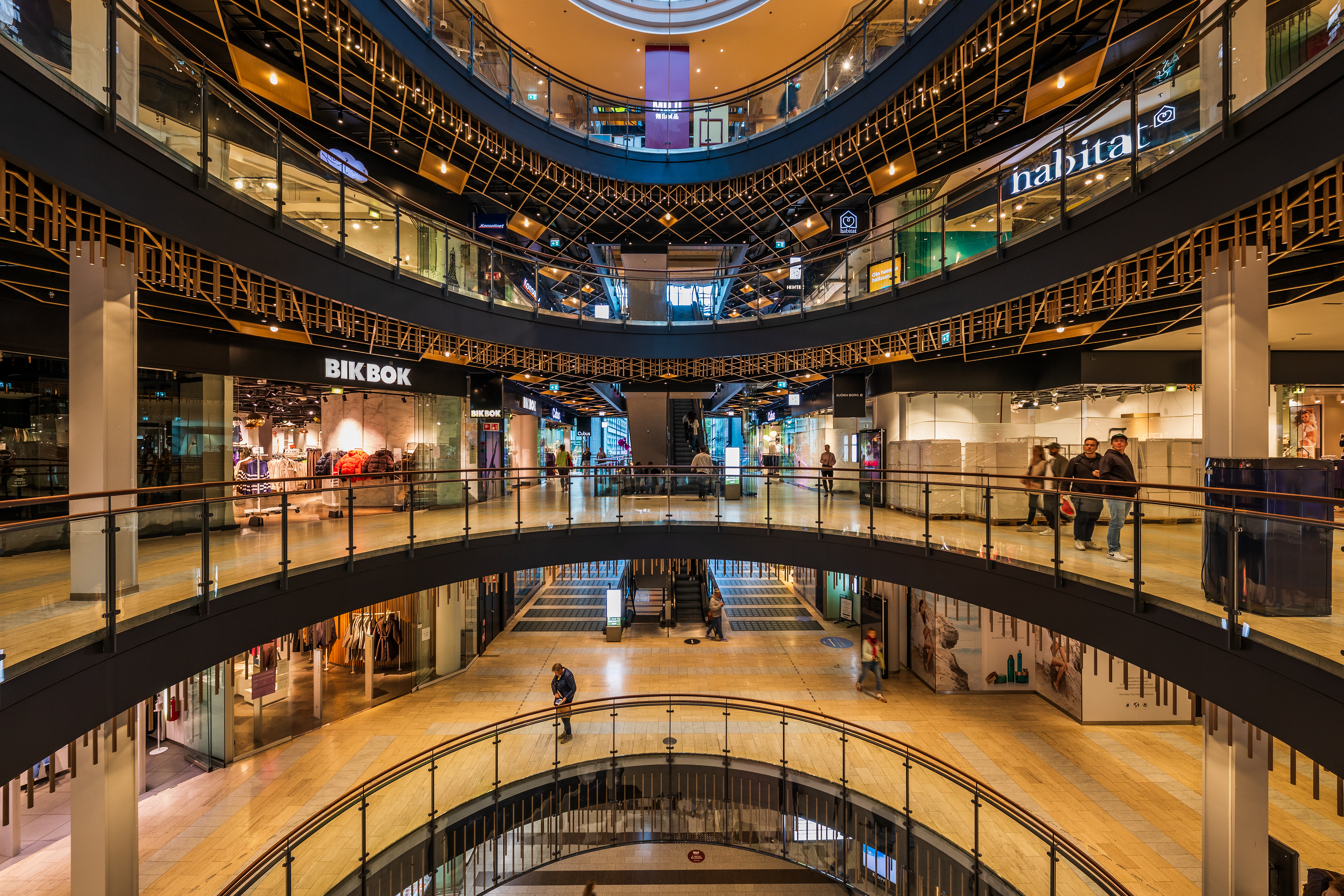
Interior in August 2022.

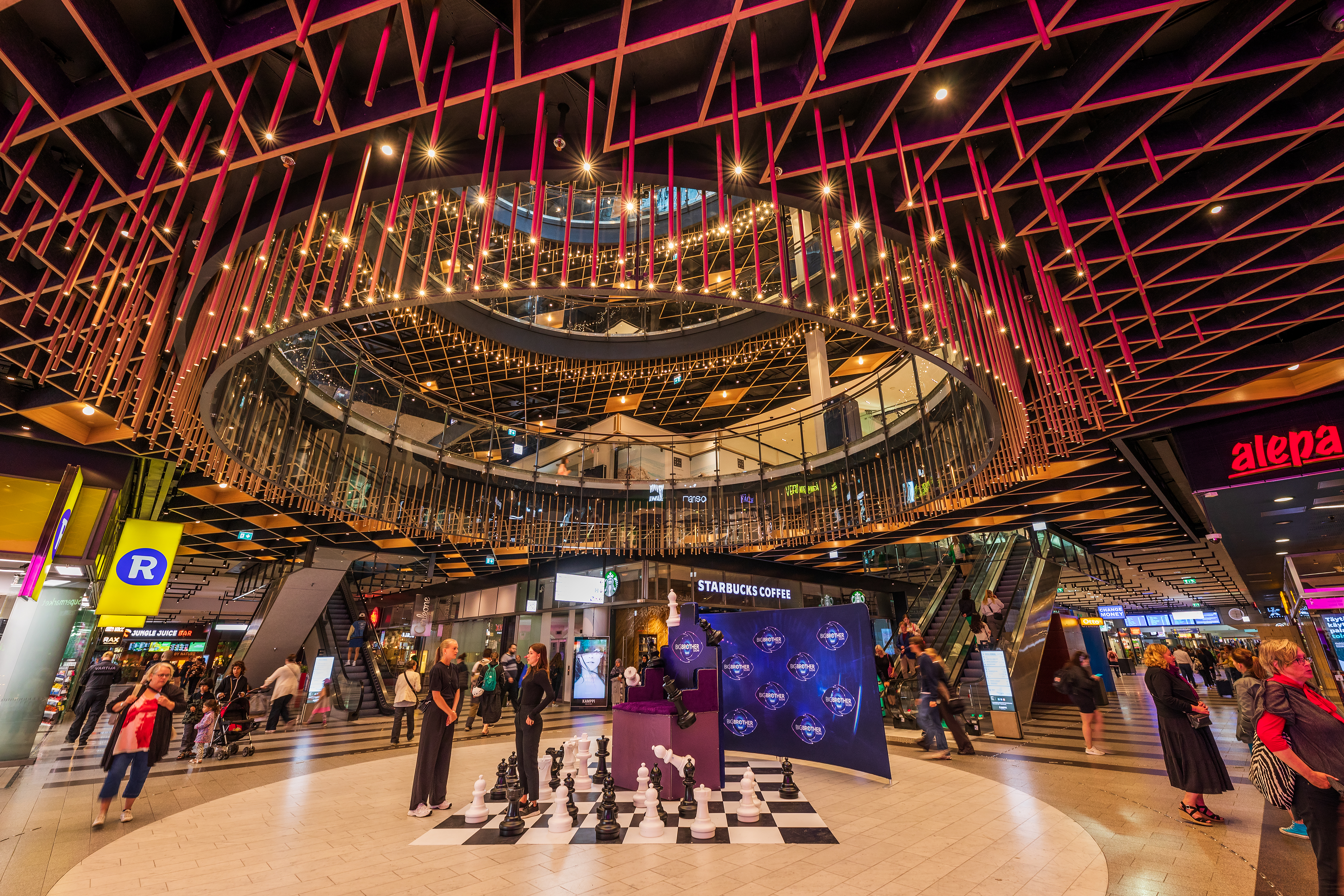
Interior in August 2022.

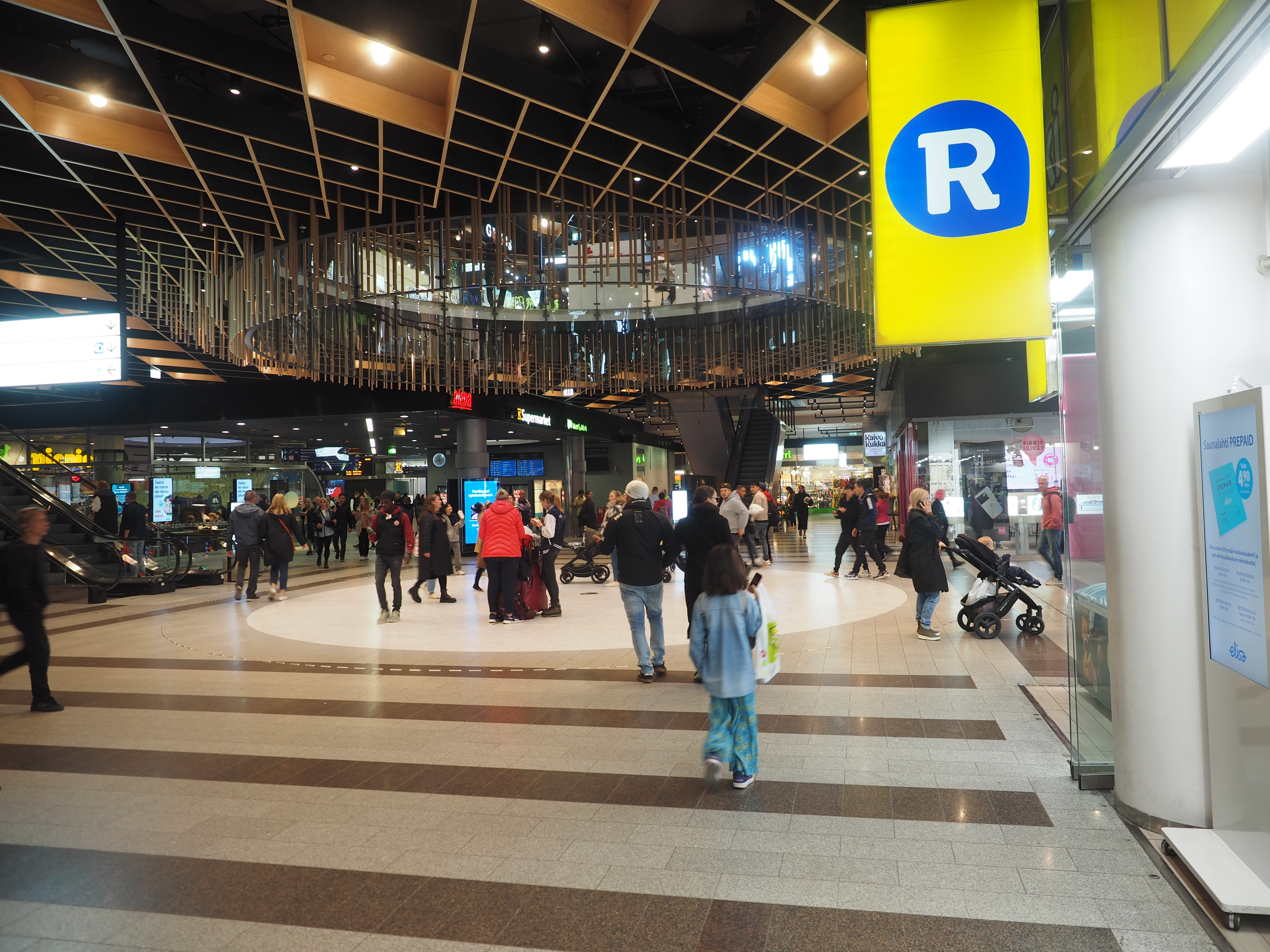

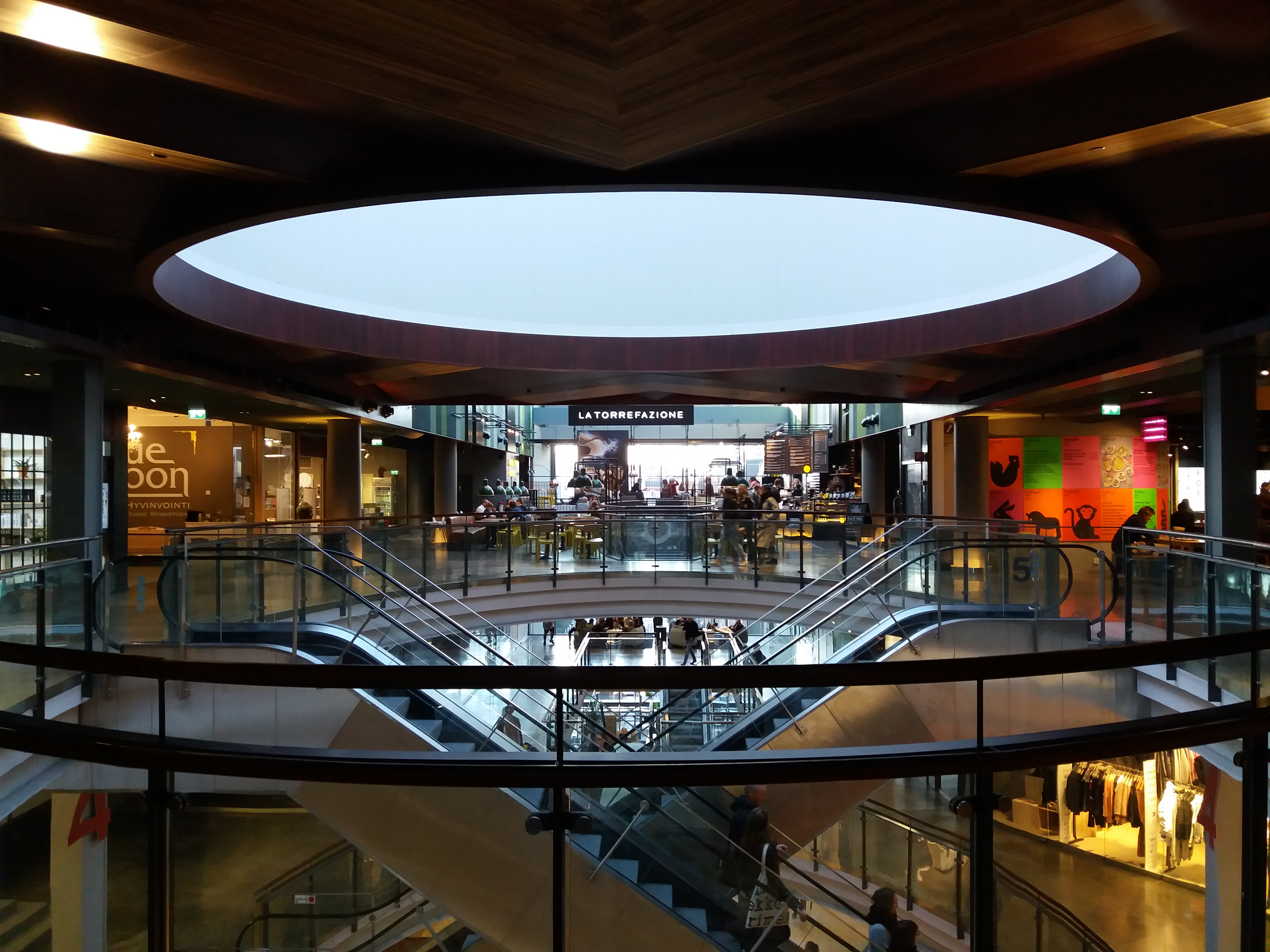

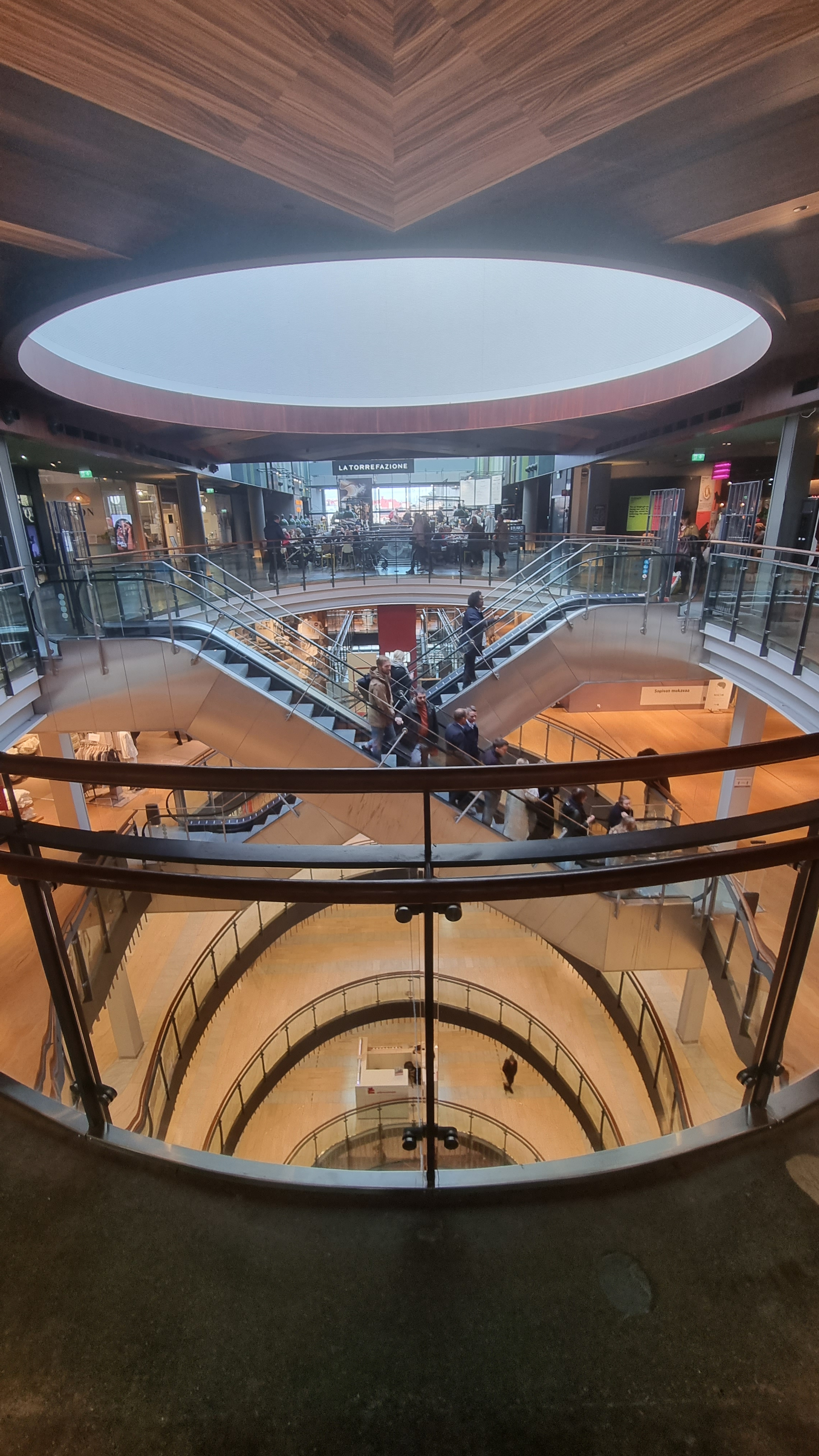

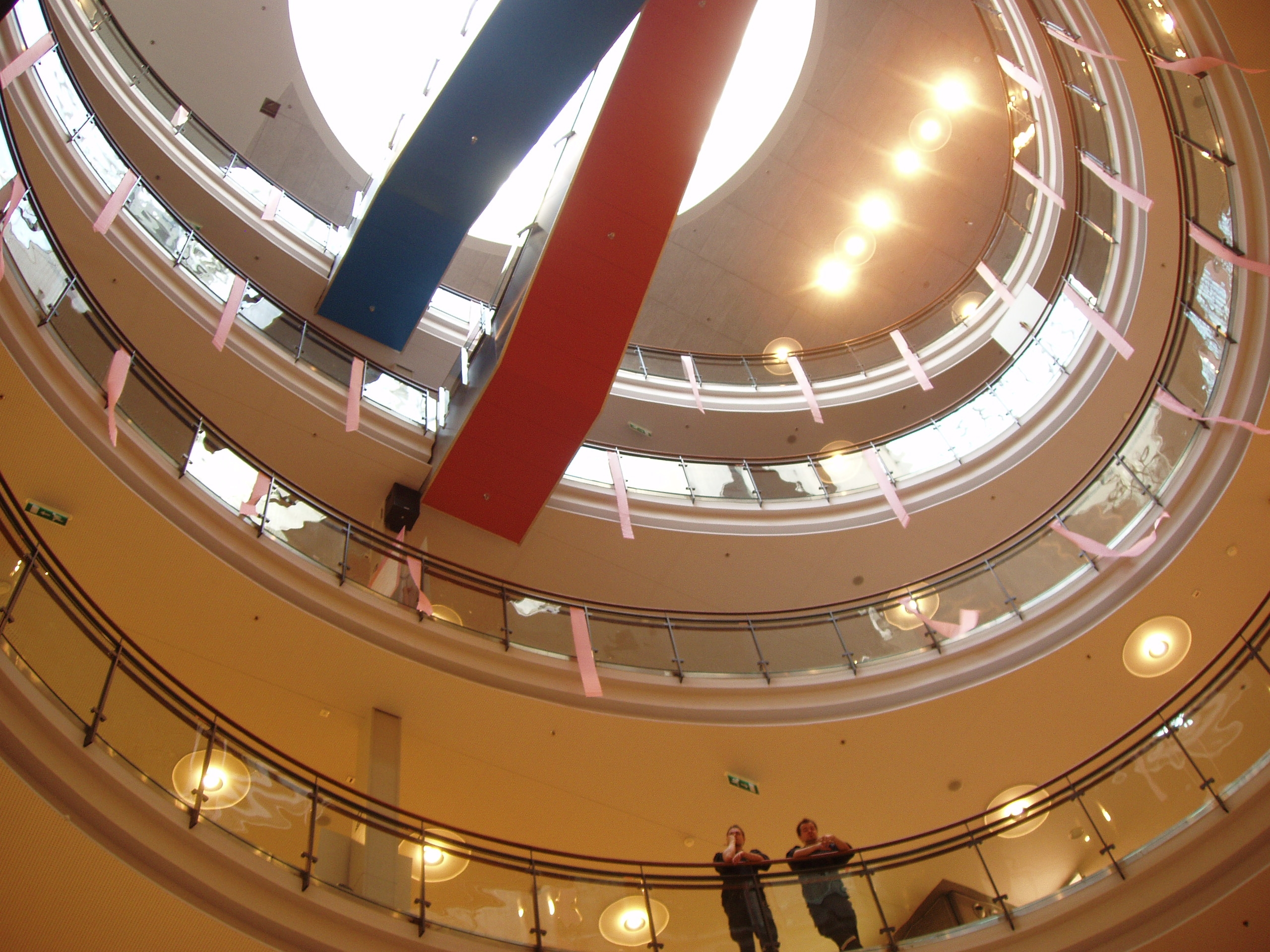

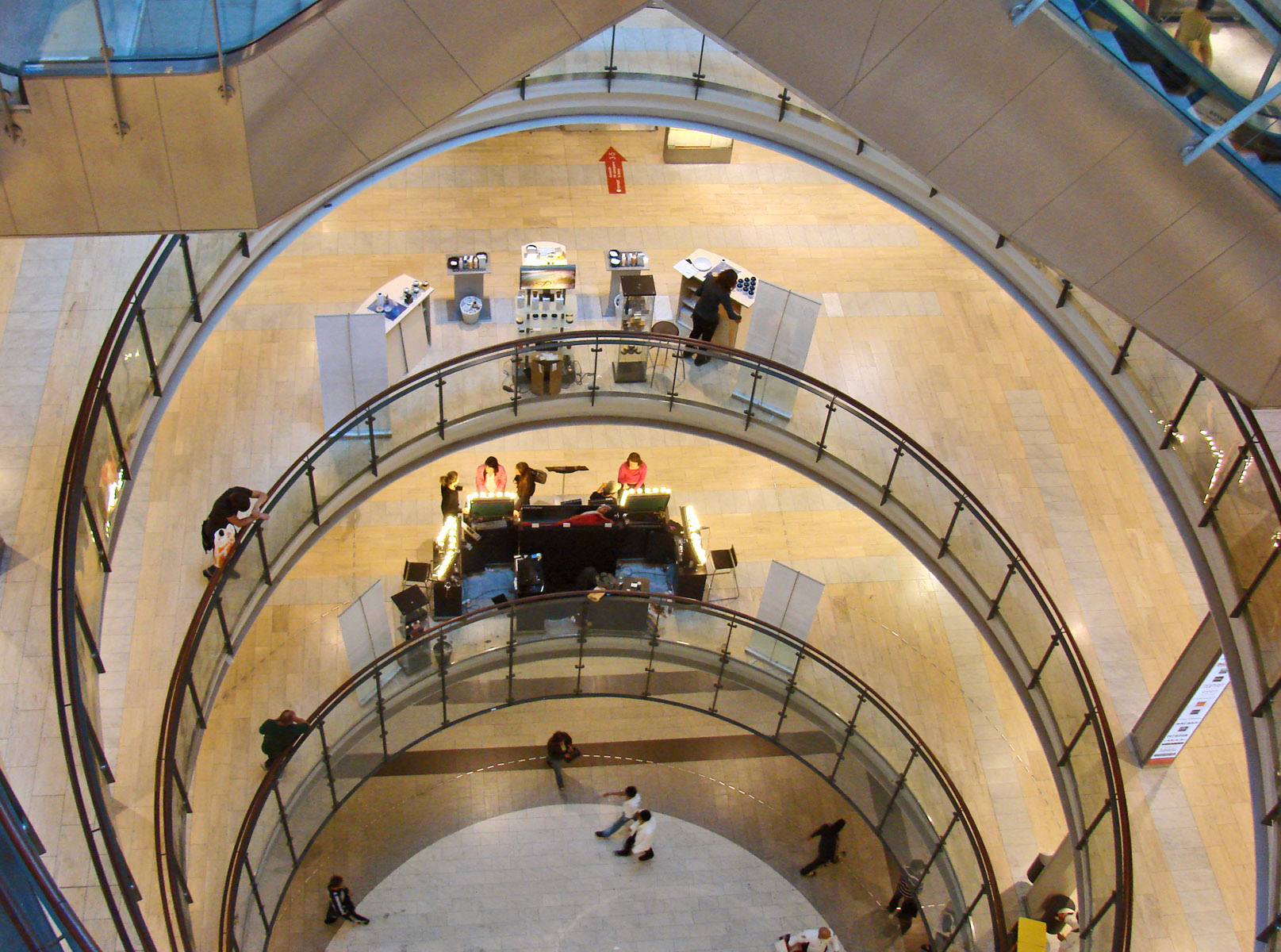

== Transport ==
=== City bus terminal ===
It is located on level E (ground level). About 900 buses pass through it daily, and during peak hours more than 100 buses per hour. The terminal has 17 platforms.

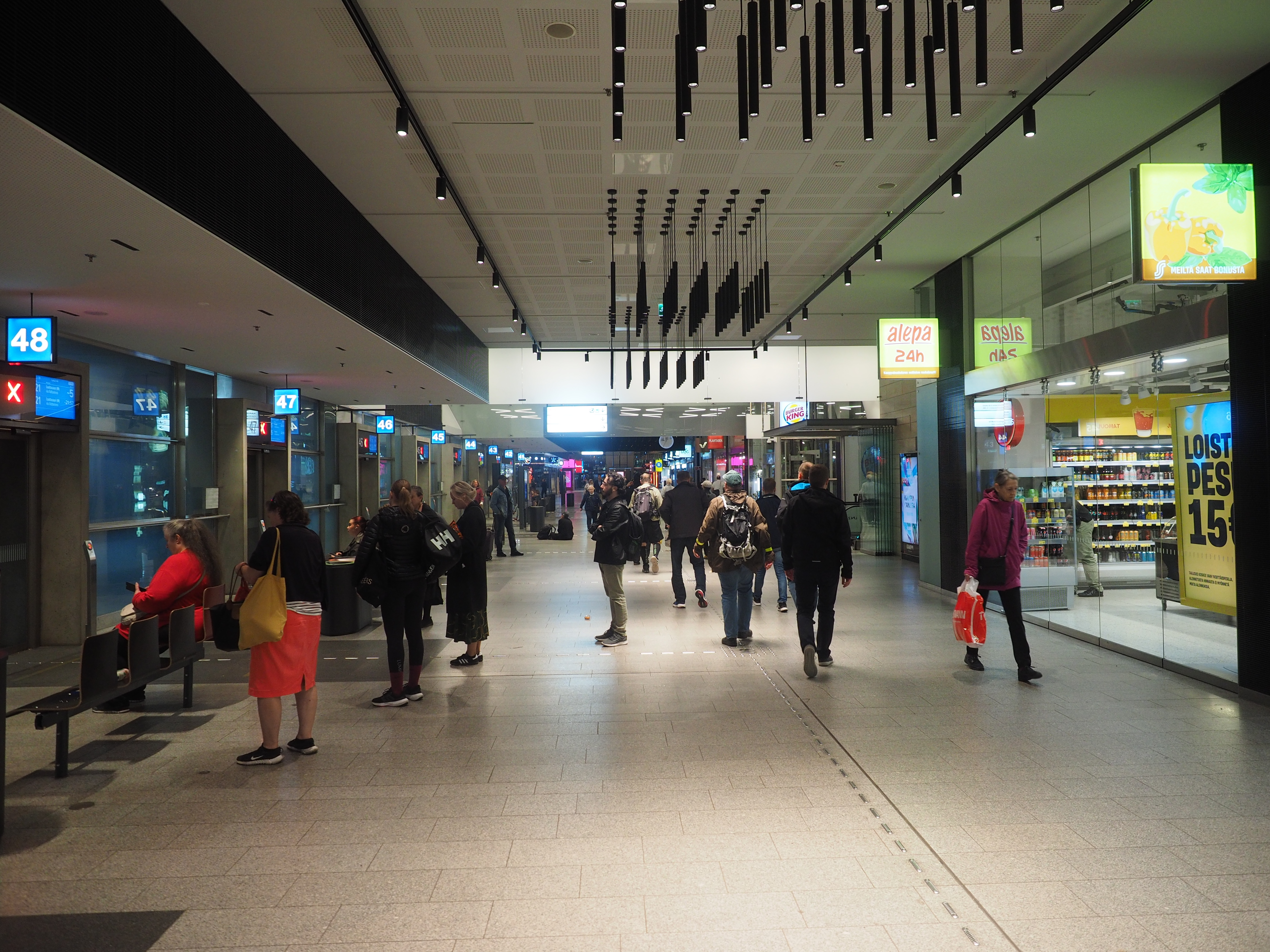

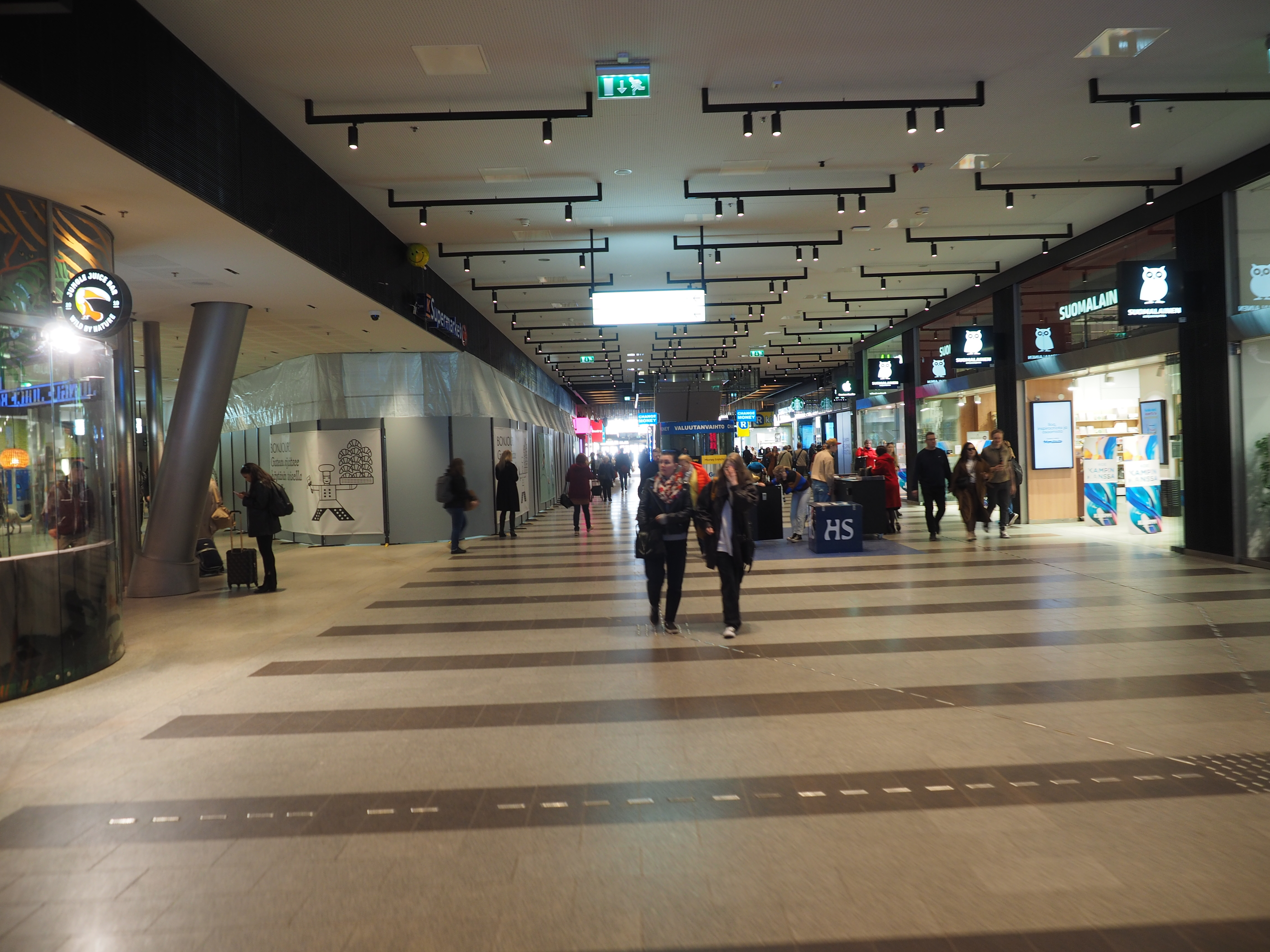

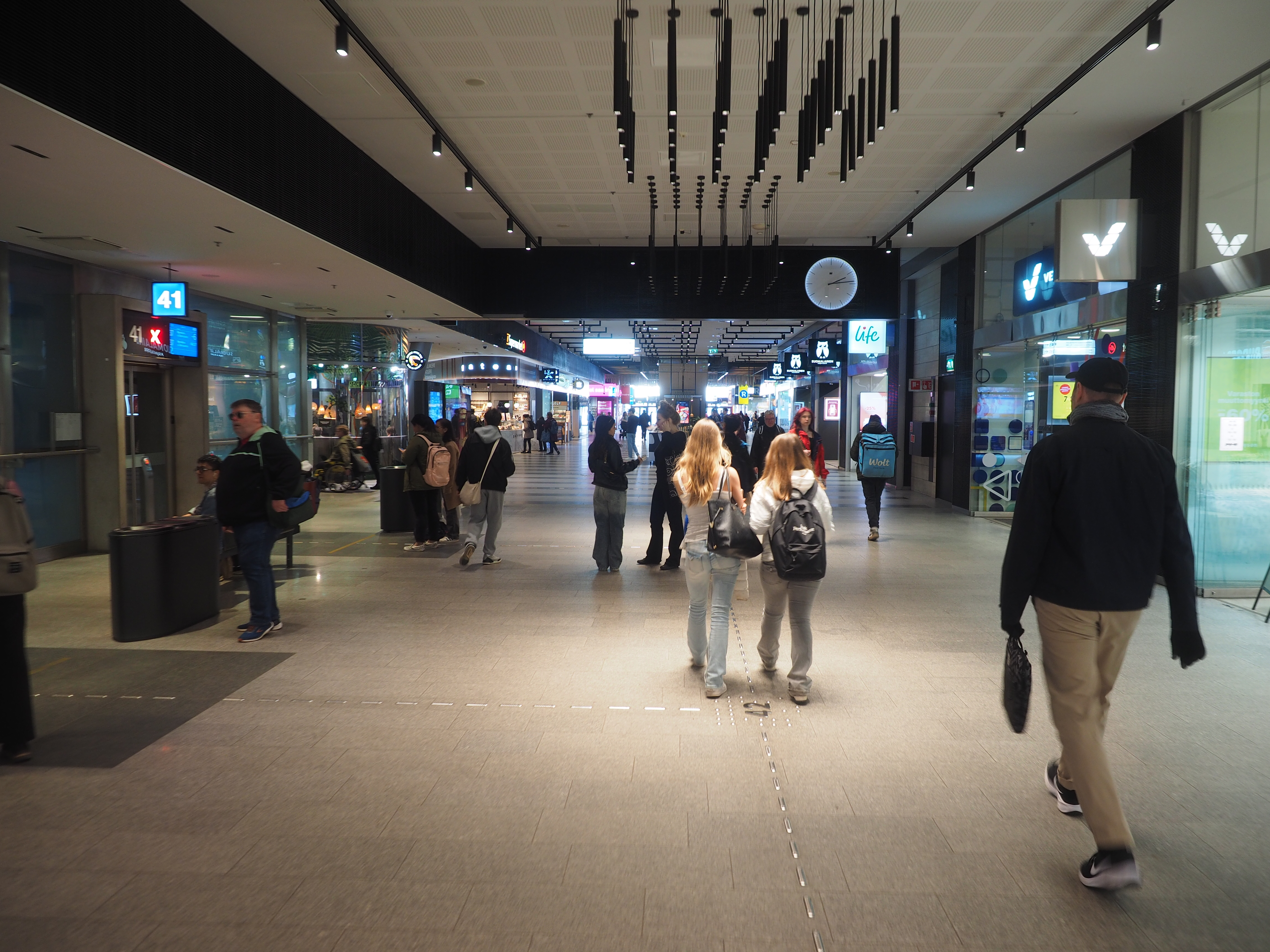

=== Intercity bus terminal ===
Located on level C (-1 floor) at about 6 meters underground. The size of the hall is 14x125 meters. About 700 intercity buses depart from here daily. The terminal has 32 platforms.

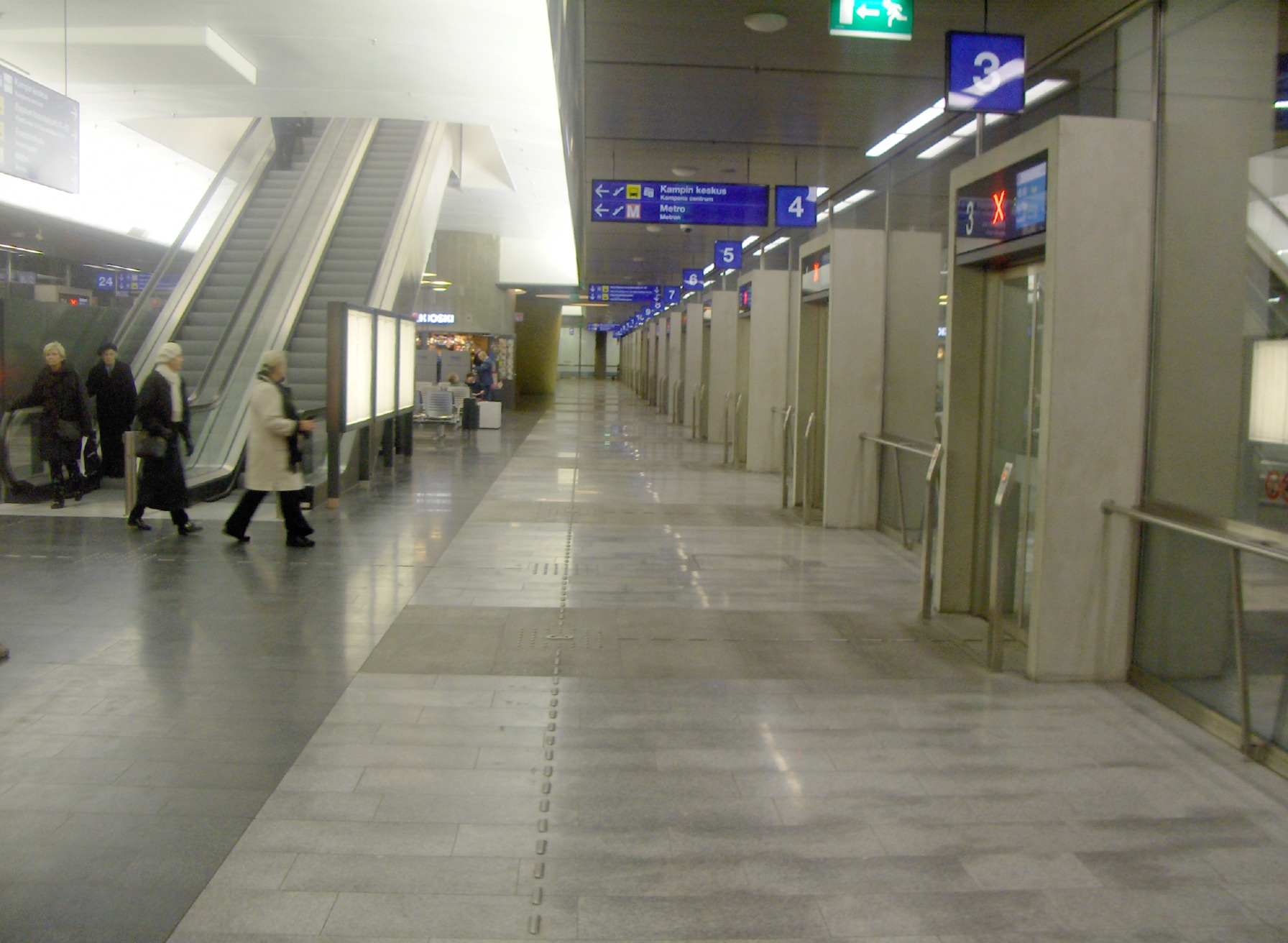

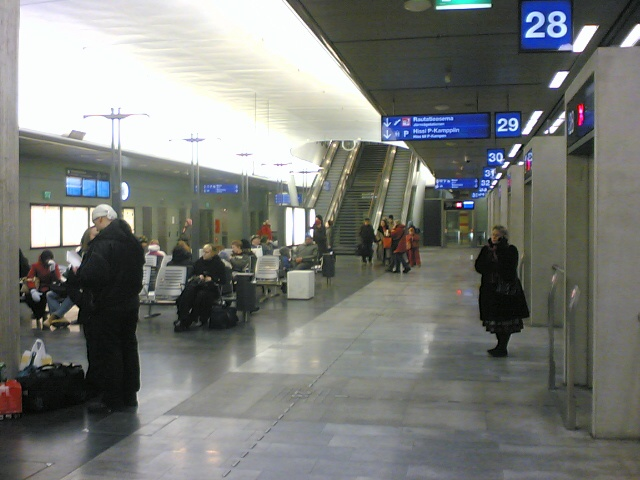

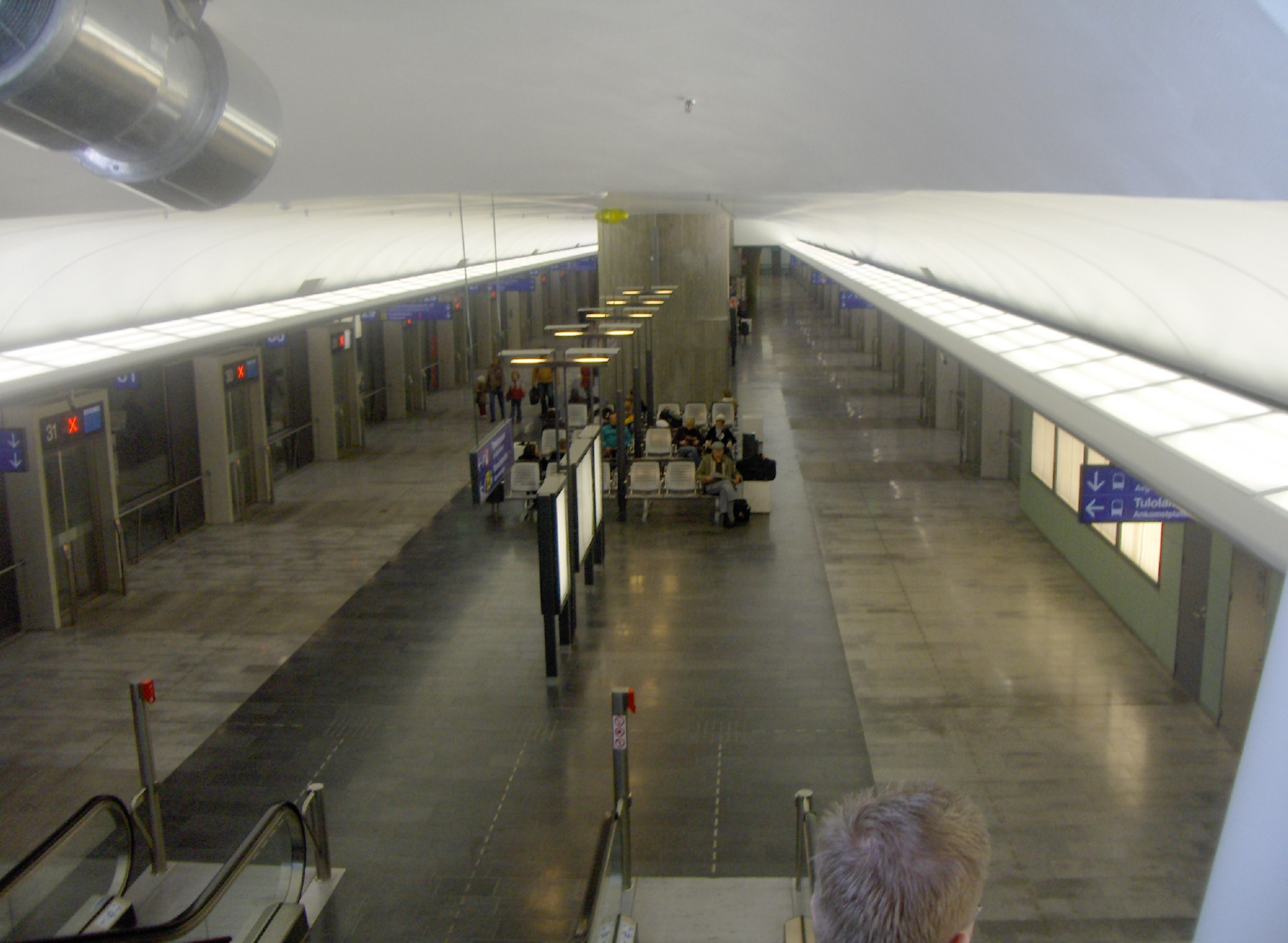

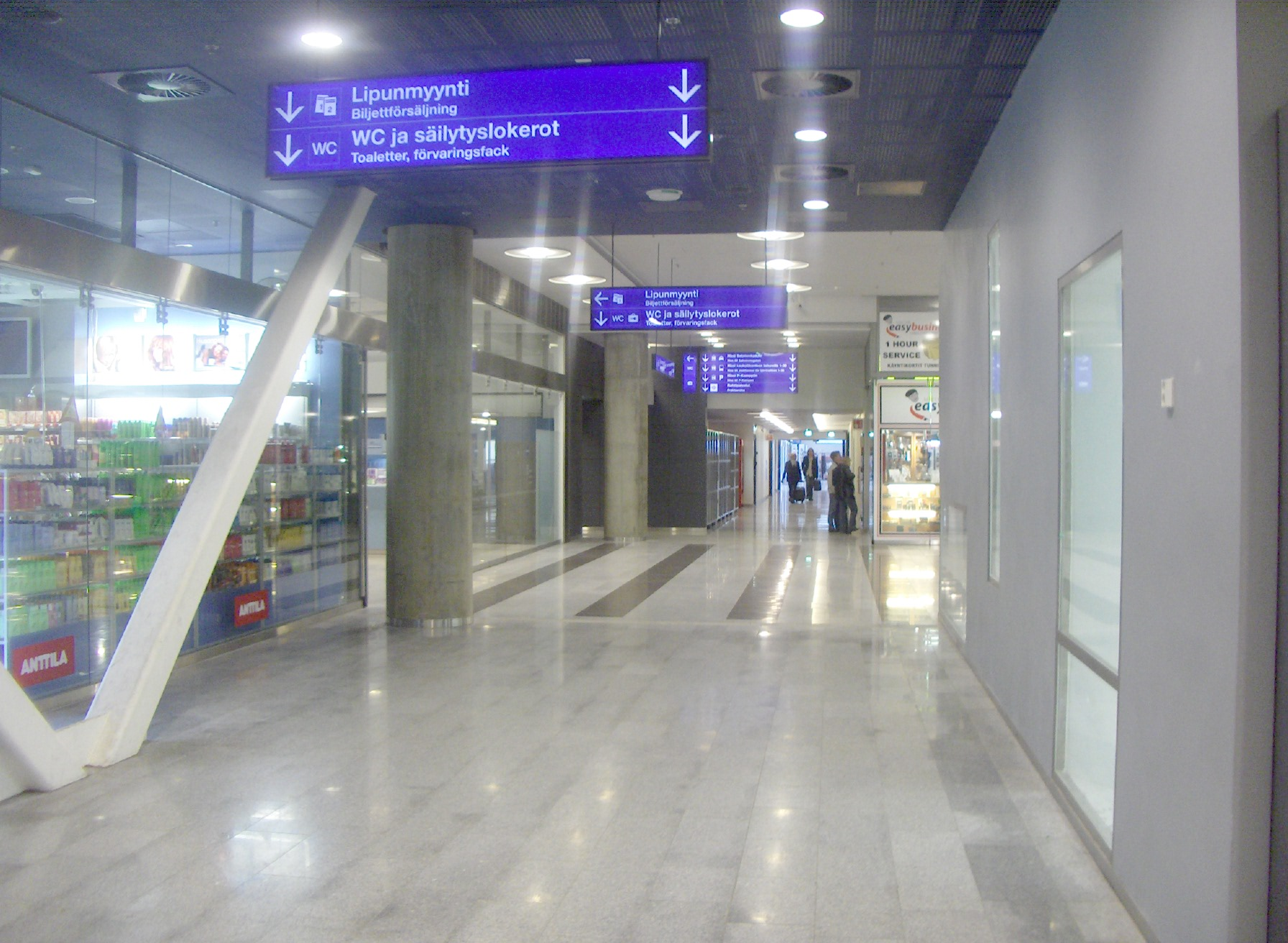

=== Subway station ===
It is located 30 meters from the surface of the ground.

Gekko is the entrance to the subway, located at ground level, in the center of the lobby. It is designed as a capsule about 4 meters in diameter, lined with ceramic tiles (surface area of about 275 m^{2}).

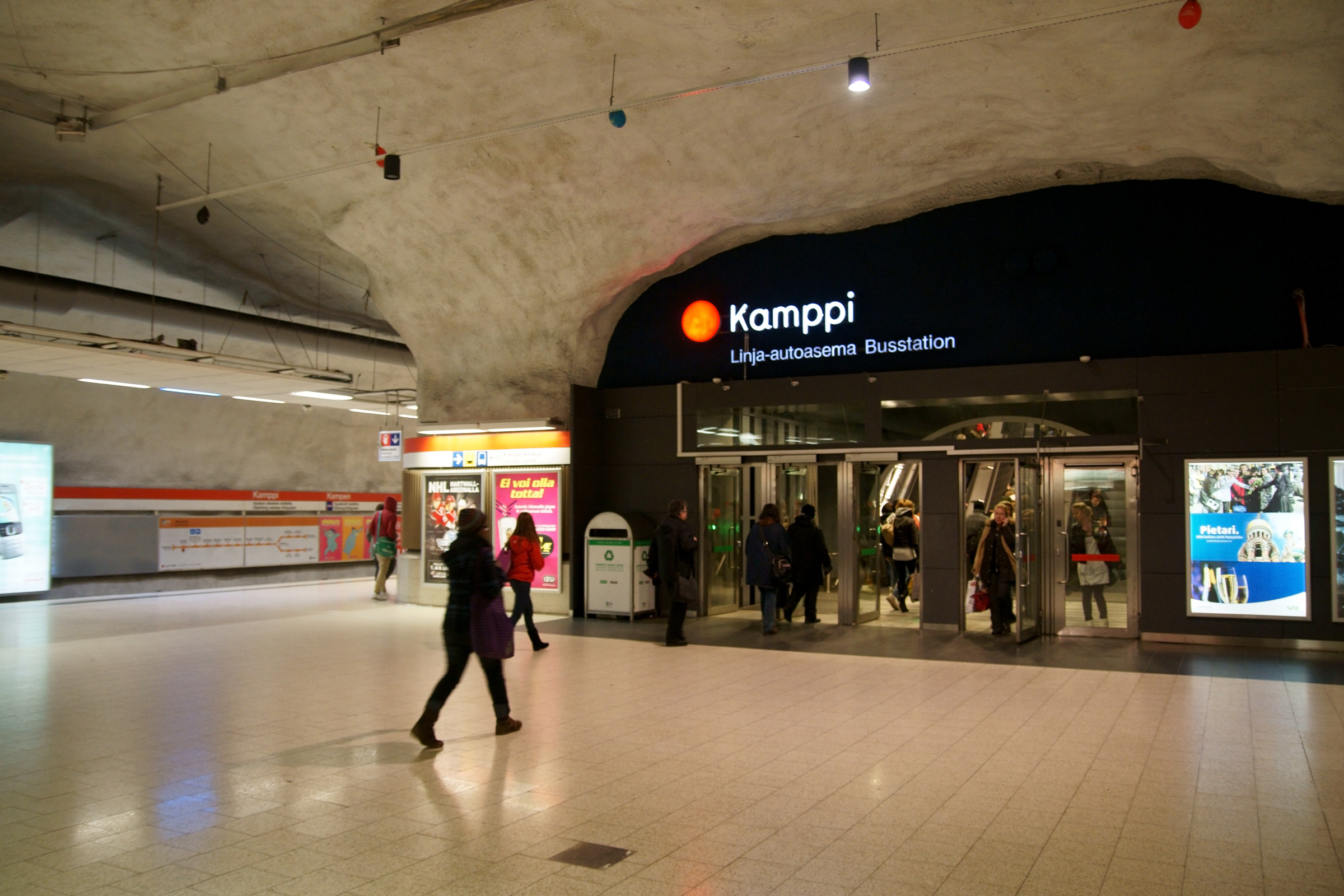
Station level.

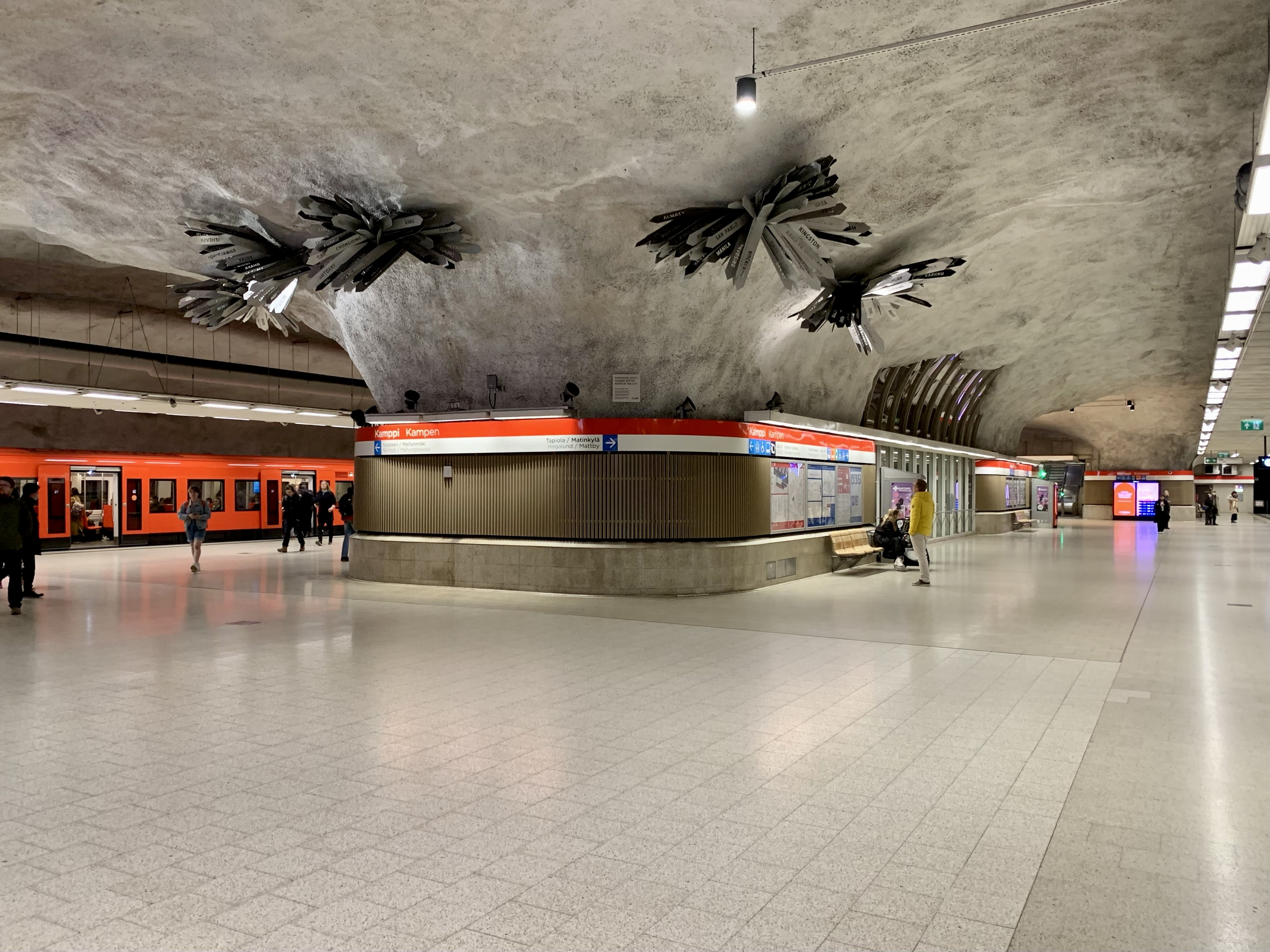
Station level.

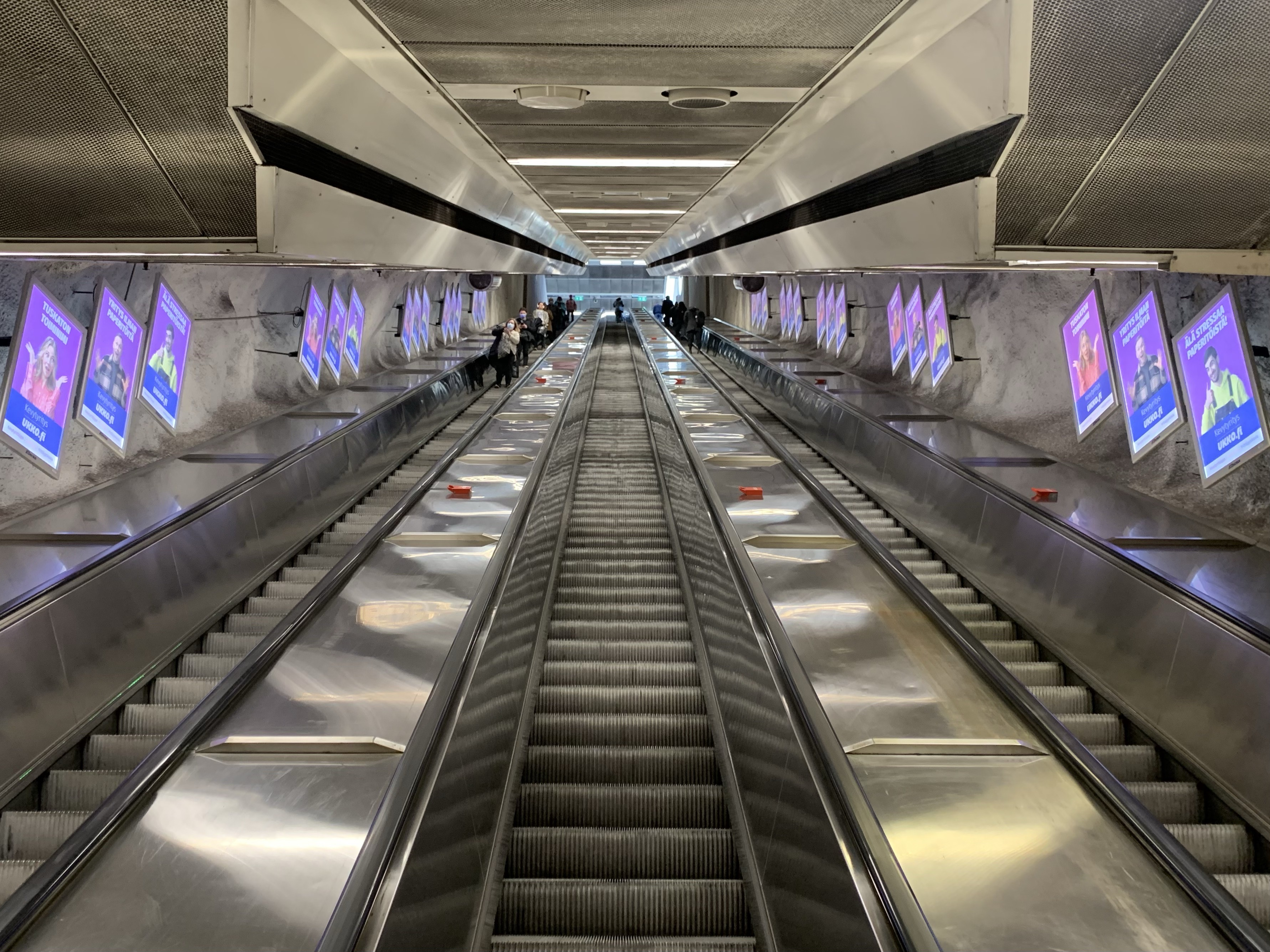
Stairs.

== History ==
The present-day Narinkka Square occupies an area that originally formed part of the Turku Barracks complex in central Helsinki. Constructed in the early 19th century, the barracks served as a major garrison for Russian imperial troops stationed in Finland. In 1918, during the Finnish Civil War, the Turku Barracks were destroyed in fighting between the Red and White factions.

== See also ==
- Forum shopping centre
- Lasipalatsi
- Amos Rex Art Museum
- Stockmann Helsinki centre
- Kämp Galleria
