= DSH =

DSH, Dsh or dsh may refer to:

== Biology ==
- Dishevelled (Dsh), a family of proteins
- Domestic shorthaired cat, the house cat
- Deutscher Schäferhund, German for German Shepherd Dog

== Health ==
- Deliberate self-harm, a psychological condition involving self-inflicted injuries
- Disproportionate share hospital, a U.S. hospital serving an above-average number of low-income patients

== Transport ==
- Deep Space Habitat, a proposed NASA design for crew living quarters in exploration of the solar system
- Dunmore railway station, New South Wales, Australia, having station code DSH
- Dash Air Charter, a U.S. airline having ICAO code DSH, see Airline codes-D

== Languages ==
- ISO 639:dsh or Daasanach language, an African language
- Dsh (trigraph), a Latin-script representation of an Irish sound

== Education ==
- Deutsche Schule Helsinki, a German- and Finnish-speaking school in Helsinki, Finland
- Deutsche Schule Hurghada (German School Hurghada)
- Deutsche Sprachprüfung für den Hochschulzugang, a German language proficiency test required to study at German higher education institutions

== Other ==
- Deep Space Habitat, 2012 NASA concepts for crewed missions
- Dick Smith (retailer), ASX code
- Dom Sylvester Houédard, an English poet and theologian known as dsh
- A track on Spunge (album)
- Subsistence Homesteads Division, a 1930s US agency
- DeepSeek Harness, a popular open-source Agent harness made by DeepSeek

== See also ==
- DSHS (disambiguation)
