= Kamppi car bomb =

The Kamppi car bomb was a car bomb that exploded on the street Pohjoinen Rautatiekatu in Kamppi, Helsinki, Finland on 16 July 2002 at about 06:50 in the morning. This was one of the very rare instances of contract killing in Finland.

Police investigation showed that the motive behind the bomb strike was not money or disputes between criminals, but instead the background was a complex network of relationship and personal problems. The perpetrator was an outsider hired to commit the crime, who was promised a large monetary reward for the deed. The perpetrator did not know the victim or the contractor in advance. According to the police, none of the people involved had any prior criminal background or problems with intoxicants or mental health.

== Course of the events ==
The bomb exploded at a traffic light near the intersection of the streets Pohjoinen Rautatiekatu and Runeberginkatu on the morning of Tuesday 16 July at about 06:50 in the morning. Parts of the exploded car were thrown distances of at most 150 to 200 metres from the site, and many of the windows of the nearby Hotel Helka broke. According to the emergency centre of Helsinki the explosion could have caused a lot more damage in central Helsinki, but because it was summer vacation time, the traffic in the morning was calmer than normal. The recreational vehicle behind the exploded car suffered damages, but the couple inside it were unharmed.

As the explosion happened only a few hundred metres away of the Parliament House and the Helsinki Synagogue, there were rumours of a political or religious motive at first.

The bomb immediately killed a 32-year-old man who had been driving the Opel Kadett which had been carrying the dynamite bomb weighing almost four kilograms. The perpetrator was the 29-year-old William Leonard Engström, who had been promised a reward of 17 thousand euro. He received an advance payment of 1,600 euro. The contractor was the 32-year-old Tommi Peter Sandroos, who had previously attempted to kill the victim personally with a pistol at Ruskeasuo, Helsinki on 1 December 2001. The victim was hit by four bullets but he survived. Engström and Sandroos did not know each other beforehand. The court later saw that the 28-year-old Otto Tuomas Pankakoski, an acquaintance of Sandroos, had pressured Engström to commit the killing. Engström drove behind the victim's car and exploded the bomb with a remote control designed for a toy. He drove very close to his victim, hit a traffic sign when the bomb exploded, and suffered minor injuries himself. The victim was the former common-law husband of Sandroos's girlfriend.

== Trial ==
The Helsinki district court sentenced the perpetrator William Engström to life imprisonment for murder and severe destruction in February 2004. In court, Engström pleaded guilty to manslaughter. Because Finnish law punishes incitement to crime as well as actual crime, Tommi Sandroos and Otto Pankakoski were also sentenced to life imprisonment. Sandroos was also found guilty of attempted murder and illegal use of firearms in connection to the shooting in December 2001. Pankakoski was sentenced for incitement to murder as well as illegal use of firearms. All of the sentenced were sent to mental health investigation, which found they had acted with full understanding. The men were also sentenced to pay compensations for the victim's daughter, brother and parents among other people. The victim's four-year-old daughter received compensation of 14 thousand euro for mental suffering and about 120 euro per month until the age of majority.

The thirty-year-old former common-law wife of the victim was also suspected of incitement to murder based on Sandroos's statement, but she was acquitted of charges after the court found Sandroos's statement to be unbelievable.

The Helsinki Court of Appeal upheld the sentences to life imprisonment for the perpetrator and inciter in its decision in June 2005. The court did not process a trial for the former common-law wife of the victim, because the charges against her had already been dropped at the district court.

== Reactions ==
The Kamppi car bomb endangered the lives and health of many people, and there had been over sixty people in the affected area. The bomb exploded near the Hotel Helka, whose windows were broken up to the third floor. The explosion caused a great shock to the tourists present at the hotel, and both they and the hotel staff underwent emergency care to help them process the events. According to emergency personnel the bomb might have caused more fatalities had it exploded outside the summer vacation period.

State prosecutor Jukka Rappe found the case to be unique in the entire criminal history of Finland. President of Finland Tarja Halonen said the bomb was a "tragic singular case" and did not believe it would cause alarm for the general safety. According to Minister of the Interior Ville Itälä the deed showed that the criminals had acted with "a great amount of negligence and ruthlessness". Itälä said that the deed had not come to him as a surprise, but that the explosion happened in the centre of Helsinki "overstepped a certain limit".

The case of the Kamppi car bomb also caused reactions from the international press. Although the police denied all suspicions of international terrorism right from the start, Reuters wrote that the explosion had happened only a few hundred metres away from the Helsinki Synagogue.

== Later stages ==
The Helsinki Court of Appeal approved the contractor's request for parole in June 2014. He was released on parole on 15 October 2015.

In December 2014 the Helsinki Court of Appeal decided to release the middle man on parole. He was released in June 2015.

The perpetrator's request for parole was approved at the Helsinki Court of Appeal in February 2015. The Criminal Sanctions Agency moved in favour of parole citing the man's "nearly faultless" behaviour in prison and that he had not committed any new crimes during the period. He had also learned himself a trade in prison. He was released on parole on 1 March 2016.

== Sources ==
- Article about the case at Turun Sanomat
- Article about the case at Helsingin Sanomat
- MTV3 Uutiset: Kampin autopommin tuomiot pysyivät ennallaan
