= Autotalo =

Office building in Helsinki, Finland

Coordinates: 60°10′08″N 24°55′46″E

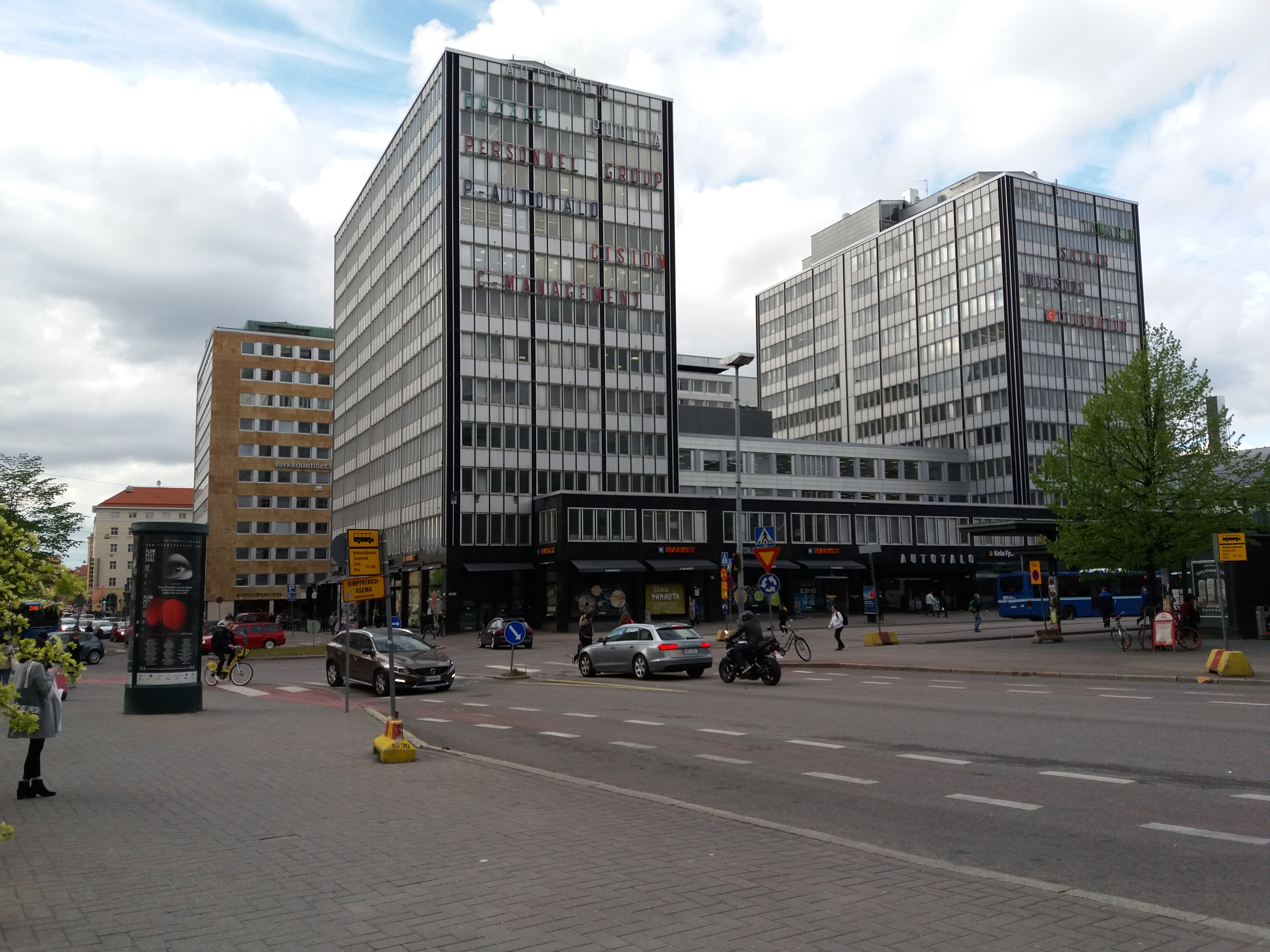
Autotalo in May 2017.

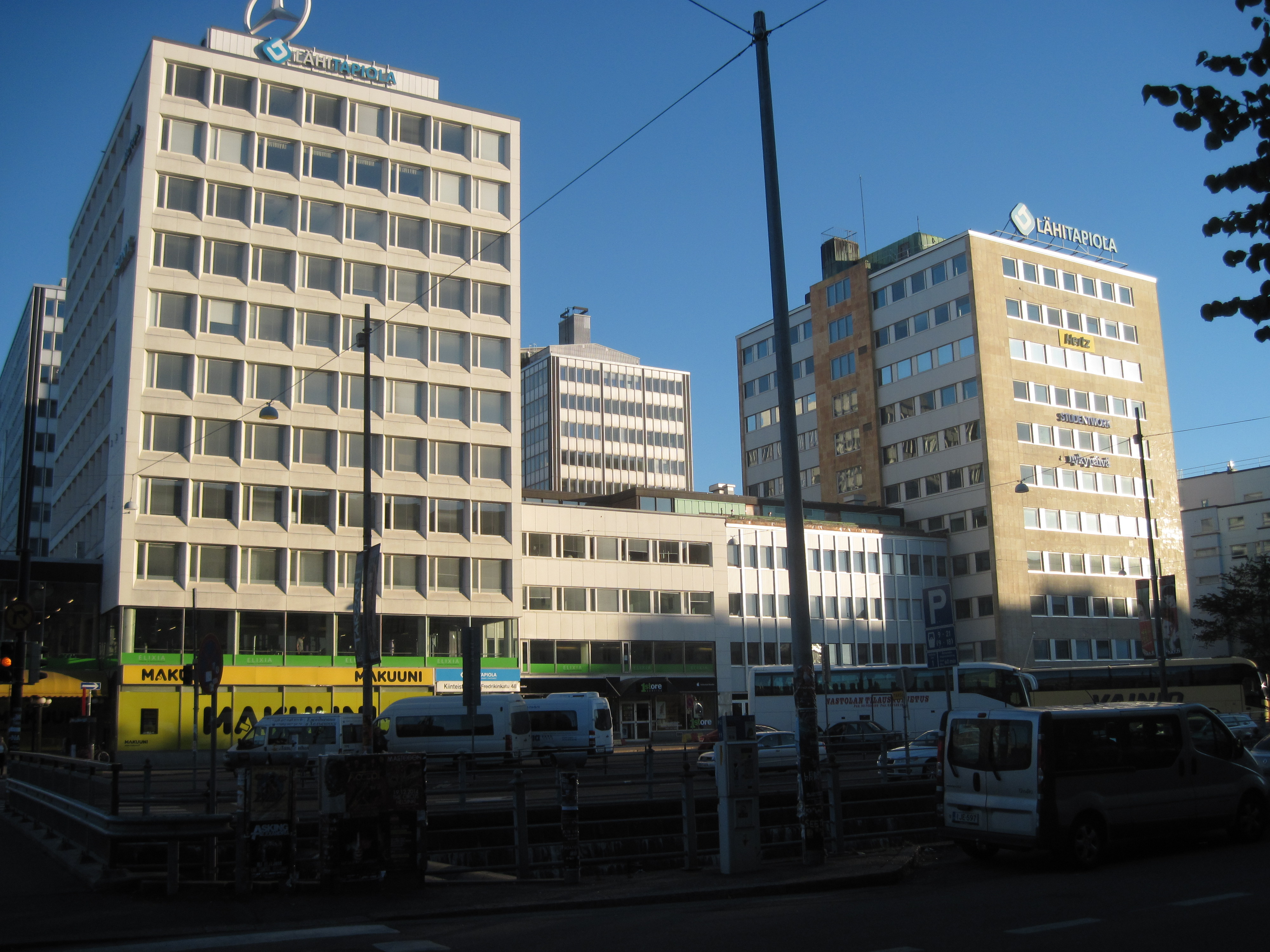
The northern half of the Autotalo block. On the left is the Kampintorni building, on the right is the former head office of the Pohja insurance company.

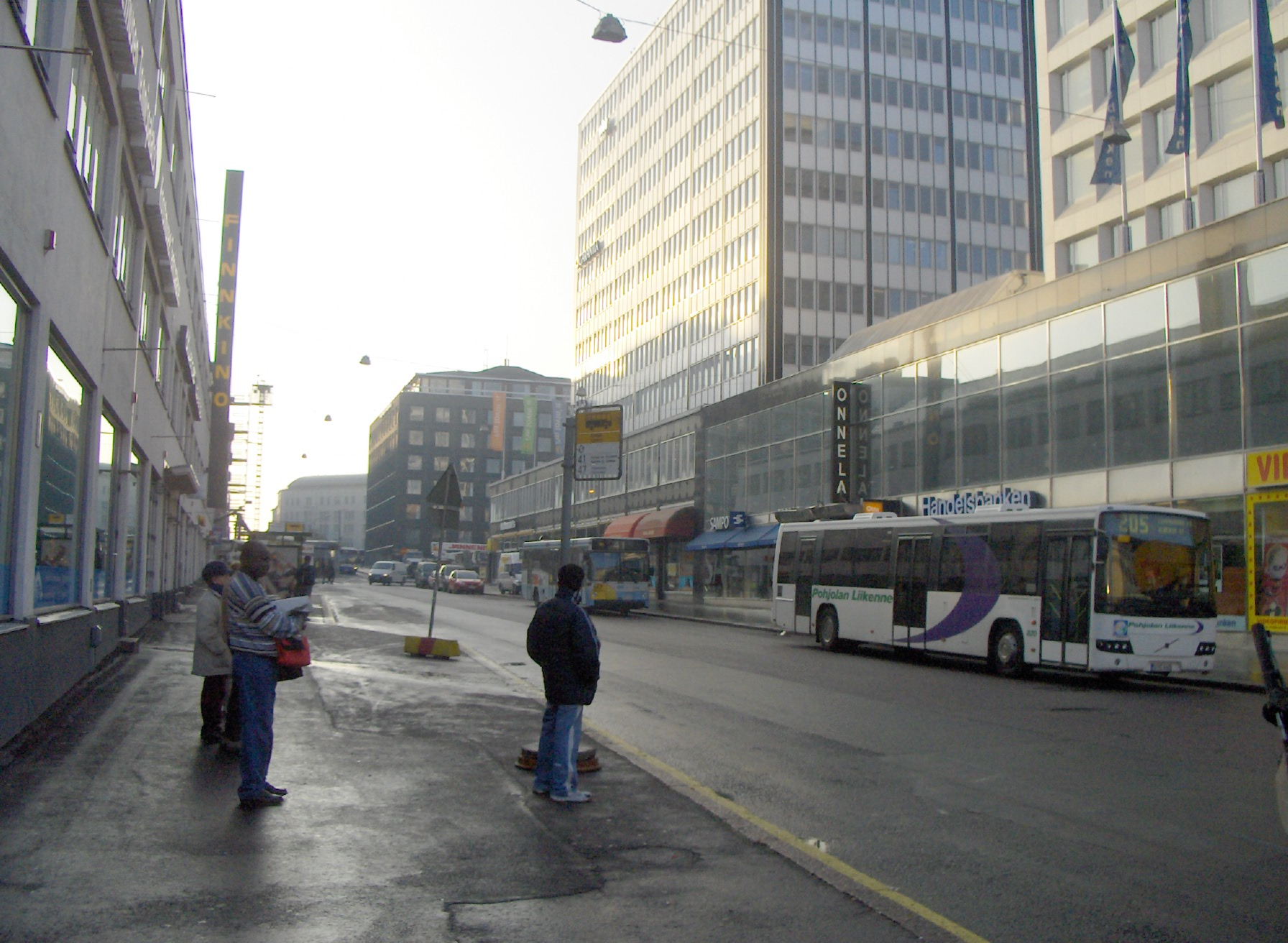
A view of Fredrikinkatu at Autotalo. On the right are the Kampintorni and Autotalo buildings, on the left is the Tennispalatsi movie theatre and cultural centre.

Autotalo (Finnish for "car house") is a business building in Kamppi, Helsinki, Finland, built in 1958. It is located near the Kamppi metro station in a lot bordered by the streets of Salomonkatu to the south, Fredrikinkatu to the east and Runeberginkatu to the west. The address of the building is Salomonkatu 17. The Autotalo building consists of two 12-floor towers, and it comprises the southern half of its city block. The name "Autotalo" is sometimes used to refer to the entire block, also consisting of the two separate high-rise buildings at the northern edge of the block, built at the same time as the Autotalo building.

== History ==
Before the construction of the Autotalo building, its site hosted a group of barracks built in the 19th century, originally forming the westernmost part of the garrison stationed at the Turku barracks. After Finland became independent the lot had been transferred to the Finnish state. The company Korpivaara & Halla had plans already during World War II to purchase the lot in order to construct a new business building, but the plan was only put to action in the late 1950s.

The building was commissioned by the company Helsingin Autotalo Oy, which was founded by the car import company Korpivaara & Halla Oy. The building was designed by architects Veli Valorinta and Eino Tuompo. The building originally housed a car dealership business and a filling station and an underground parking garage for 300 cars. The tower hosted offices, including the office of the advertising agency Taucher and the office of the magazine Apu until it moved to Herttoniemi. In the 1960s and the 1970s the building hosted the show restaurant Lido.

== Architecture ==
The building has 12 floors above the ground and three floors beneath it, with a total volume of almost 200,000 m^{3} (260,000 cu yd). Of the underground floors, only the two lower ones reach to the edge of the streets, forming a sort of pedestal supporting the two tower structures. The height of the towers is 42.4 metres (139 ft). The building draws architectural inspiration from the Lever House in New York City, although the towers in Autotalo are shorter; the towers in the Lever House have 24 floors.

The building has undergone extensive repairs, completed in autumn 2014.

== The Autotalo block and its other buildings ==
The name Autotalo originally only referred to the business building on the southern half of the block with its two towers, but nowadays the entire block is referred to as Autotalo or the Autotalo block. The northern part of the block hosts two business buildings built at the same time with their towers and short pedestal-like parts. The western building, located at the intersection between Runeberginkatu and Eteläinen Rautatienkatu, was designed by Armas Lehtinen, and it originally served as the office of the Pohja insurance company. The intersection between Fredrikinkatu and Eteläinen Rautatienkatu hosts the Kampintorni building built in 1962. The block hosts four towers in total. The buildings have facades of different materials. The towers of the Autotalo building proper have metal facades, whereas the that of the Pohja insurance company tower is made of yellow-brown stone, and that of the Kampintorni tower is made of light marble.

== Current use ==
Despite its name, the Autotalo building no longer hosts a car dealership business. The ground floor hosts the customer service office of Kela, a K-Market grocery store and a McDonald's restaurant. As of 2018, the floors above the ground floor have hosted an office of the aTalent recruiting company and Cision.

Both the building previously hosting the Pohja insurance company (Runeberginkatu 5) and the Kampintorni building (Fredrikinkatu 48) now host offices of the insurance and investment company LähiTapiola. The Kampintorni building also hosts an Elixia health club.
