= DNY =

DNY may refer to:

- Diocese of New York (disambiguation)
- DNY callsign
  - KDNY-LP
  - WDNY (disambiguation)
- United States District Court for the District of New York
- Deni language (ISO 639 code: dny)
- The Denali Fund Inc. (stock ticker DNY); see Companies listed on the New York Stock Exchange (D)
- Danby railway station (station code DNY), Esk Valley Line, Danby, North Yorkshire, England, UK
- Danish Navy (ICAO airline code DNY), see List of airline codes (D)
- Diploma In Naturopathy & Yoga (DNY), at Sunrise University
