= Dallas Express (disambiguation) =

Dallas Express was an African American newspaper published from 1892 to 1970.

Dallas Express may also refer to:

- Dallas Express (LSSA), a soccer club in the Lone Star Soccer Alliance
- Dallas Express Airlines, an airline in operation from 1993 to 1995
- The Dallas Express (website), a conservative news website established in 2021 and published by Monty Bennett
