= Kamppi Chapel =

Chapel in Helsinki, Finland

- Finnish: Kampin kappeli Swedish: Kampens kapell
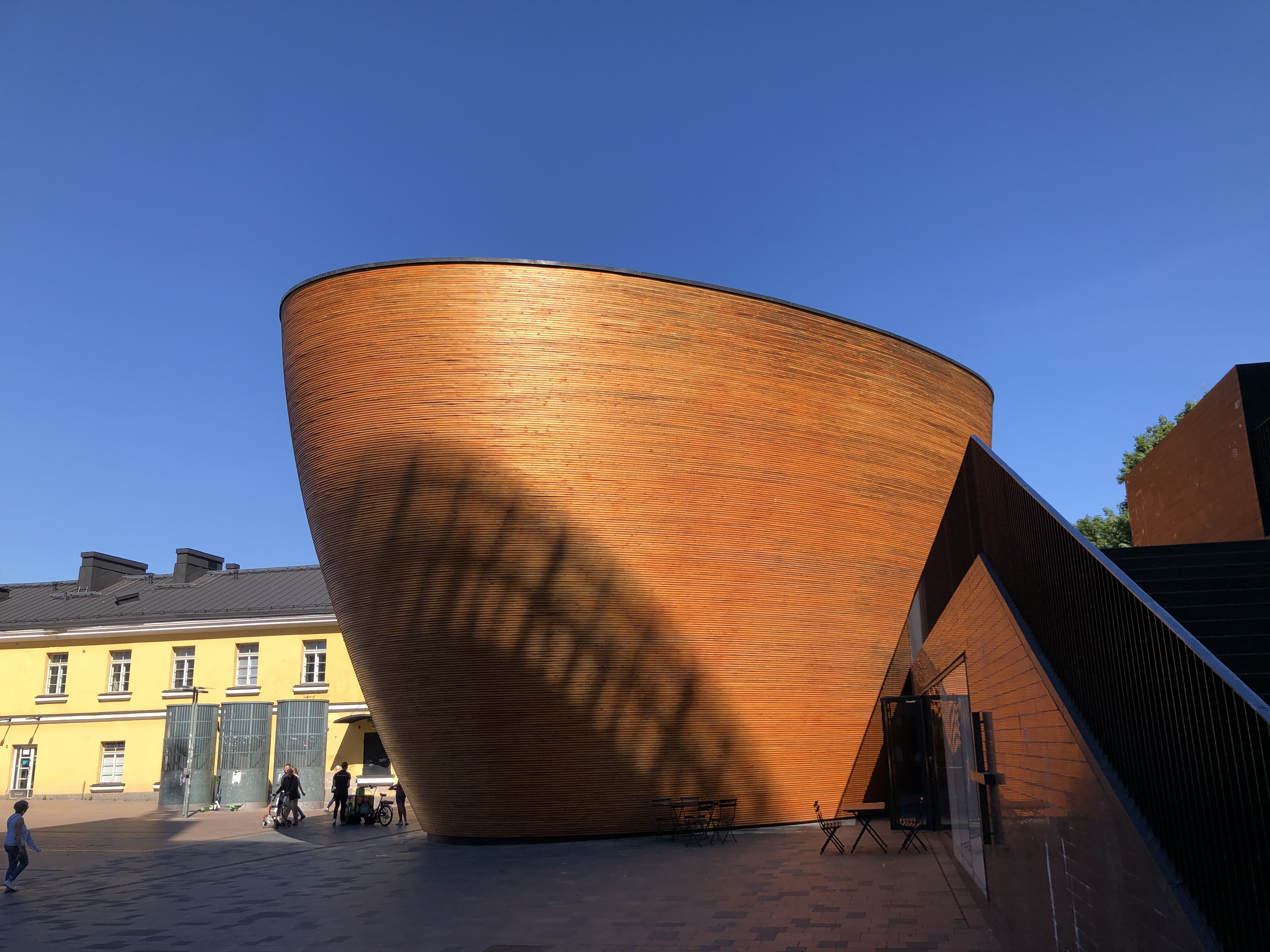
- View from the Narinkka Square
- Kamppi Chapel
- 60°10.16′N 024°56.16′E
- Location: Kamppi, Helsinki
- Country: Finland
- Denomination: Evangelical Lutheran Church of Finland

History
- Status: Chapel

Architecture
- Functional status: Active
- Architect(s): Kimmo Lintula, Niko Sirola and Mikko Summanen
- Completed: 1 February 2012

Specifications
- Height: 11.5 m (37 ft 9 in)

Administration
- Parish: Helsinki Parish Union

The Kamppi Chapel (Finnish: Kampin kappeli, Swedish: Kampens kapell) is a chapel in the neighbourhood of Kamppi in Helsinki, Finland, located on the Narinkka Square. It is also known as the "Chapel of Silence" since it is intended to be a place to calm down and have a moment of silence in one of the busiest areas of the city.

The chapel is operated on a partnership basis by the Helsinki Parish Union and the Social Services Department of the City of Helsinki, while the parish unions of the neighbouring cities of Espoo and Vantaa also participate in the chapel's activities. Regular church services are not being held in the chapel, though it is planned to hold regular moments of prayer in the future.

== Ecumenical Chapel ==
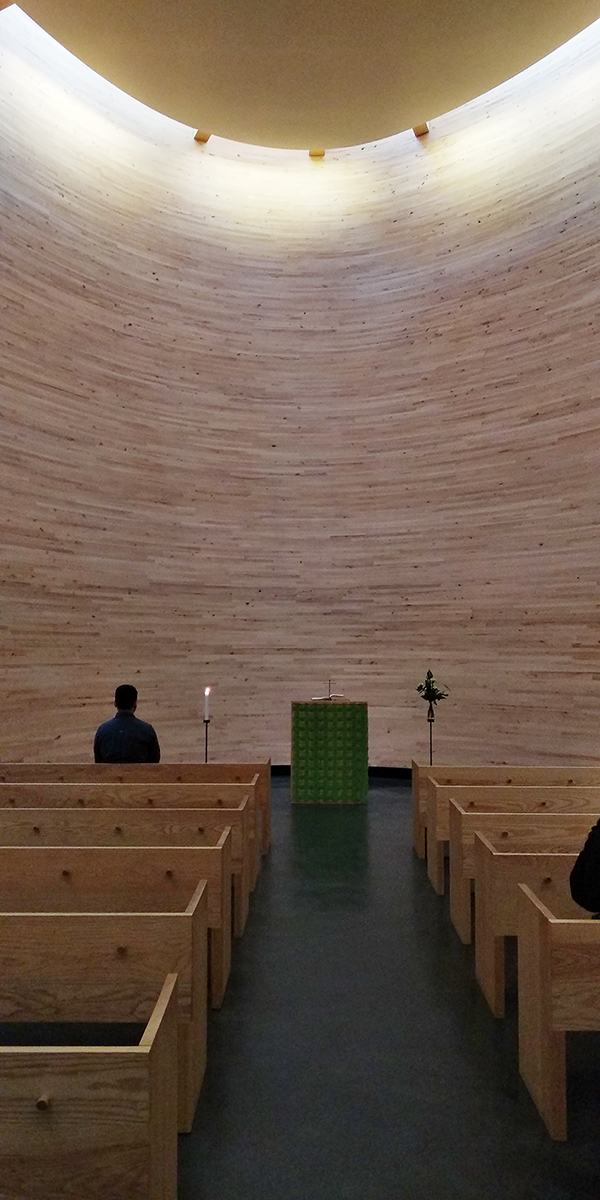
Inside the Kamppi Chapel in Helsinki.

The chapel is ecumenical and welcomes everyone irrespective of religion, philosophy of life or background. The chapel's overall design (both on the interior and exterior) is very austere and simplistic, as well as mostly neutral, bearing some semblance to a multi-faith prayer room.

The representatives of both the parishes and the Social Services Department are available in the chapel for personal discussions.

The chapel was constructed as a part of the World Design Capital program in 2012. It was designed by architects Kimmo Lintula, Niko Sirola and Mikko Summanen of K2S Architects Ltd., and won the International Architecture Awards in 2010. The chapel became popular immediately after it was opened; some 250,000 people had visited by January 2013. A year later, the chapel received its 500,000th visitor. CNN called the building an architectural landmark and said: "The chapel demonstrates how contemporary architecture at its best can fascinate and inspire."
