= EDNY (disambiguation) =

EDNY may refer to:

- The United States District Court for the Eastern District of New York
  - The United States Attorney for the Eastern District of New York, the chief federal prosecutor before this district court
- The ICAO code for Friedrichshafen Airport, Germany
- Jameel Edny, a baseball player on the 2015 Bethune–Cookman Wildcats baseball team
- Alexander Moffat, Commendator of Edny; born 1590 in Scotland
  - Edny, an alternative form for Udny of Aberdeenshire
