= Töölöntori =

Square in Helsinki, Finland

Coordinates: 60.1790°N 24.9242°E

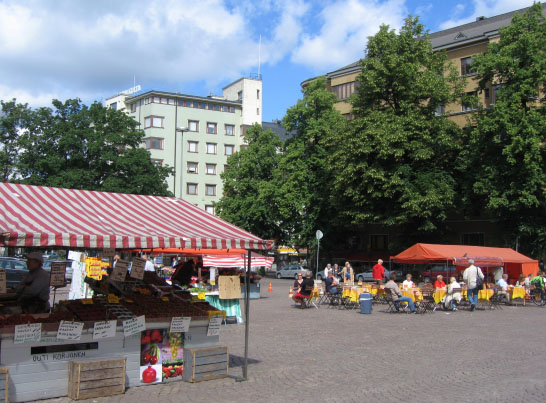
Töölöntori in summer 2008

Töölöntori (Swedish: Tölö torg) is an urban square and marketplace in the Töölö district of central Helsinki, Finland. It is bounded in the west by Runeberginkatu and the southern end of Topeliuksenkatu, in the north by Tykistönkatu; Töölöntorinkatu forms its eastern limit, and Sandelsinkatu its southern.

Töölöntori is a local transport node, due to the busy road traffic along Runeberginkatu and Topeliuksenkatu, as well as trams (as of January 2021, routes 1, 2 and 8) traversing it. The planned extension of the Helsinki Metro network also includes a new station at Töölöntori.

The square is used for daily (Mon-Sat) open-air markets, as well as occasionally hosting other functions. It is also partly used for car parking. Following a design competition by the City of Helsinki, there are plans to develop the space in a more resident-friendly manner, to include a fountain, new seating areas, a market hall and, in the winter, an ice rink.

Much of the Töölöntori and surrounding cityscape dates back to 1930s, and forms part of the Taka-Töölö urban milieu, recognised by Docomomo for its architectural merits, and designated and protected by the Finnish Heritage Agency as a nationally important built cultural environment (Valtakunnallisesti merkittävä rakennettu kulttuuriympäristö).
