= List of airline codes (D) =

This is a list of all airline codes. The table lists the IATA airline designators, the ICAO airline designators and the airline call signs (telephony designator). Historical assignments are also included for completeness.

== Codes ==
Airline codes
IATA	ICAO	Airline	Call sign	Country	Comments
	DJT	Dreamjet	DREAMJET	France	2014
	DPJ	Delta Private Jets	JET CARD	United States	Changed from ELJ/ELITE JET in 2014
	DJR	Desert Jet	DESERT FLIGHT	United States	
	DLA	Air Dolomiti	DOLOMITI	Italy	
	DLC	Dehong South Asian General Aviation	SOARCOPTER	China	Was Ruili Jingcheng Helicopters
DL	DLH	Deutsche Luft Hansa	DEUTSCHE LUFT HANSA	Germany	Became Lufthansa
	DNS	Dniproaviaservis Company		Ukraine	
	DRF	Dream Flyers Training Center		Spain	
	DMF	DMCFLY	DEMLY	Mexico	
	NAU	Danaus Lineas Aereas	DANAUS	Mexico	
	GDF	DF Aviation		Ukraine	
	DDA	D & D Aviation	DUSTY	United States	
	DNK	D&K Aviation	DIRECT JET	United States	
V5	VPA	DanubeWings	VIP TAXI	Slovakia	Former names VIP Air and VIP Wings
	DHE	DAP Helicopteros	HELIDAP	Chile	
	VLF	DFS UK Limited	VOLANTE	United Kingdom	
WD	DSR	DAS Air Cargo	DAIRAIR	Uganda	
	RKC	DAS Airlines	DAS CONGO	Democratic Republic of the Congo	
DX	DTR	DAT Danish Air Transport	DANISH	Denmark	
	ENT	DAT Enterprise Limited	DATENT	United Kingdom	defunct
	BDN	DERA Boscombe Down	GAUNTLET	United Kingdom	
	DSN	DESNA	DESNA	Ukraine	
	DET	DETA Air	SAMAL	Kazakhstan	
	DGO	DGO Jet	DGO JET	Mexico	
	DAE	DHL Aero Expreso	YELLOW	Panama	
D0	DHK	DHL Air Limited	WORLD EXPRESS	United Kingdom	DHL Air UK
	DHV	DHL Aviation	WORLDSTAR	South Africa	
ES	DHX	DHL International	DILMUN	Bahrain	
L3	JOS	DHL de Guatemala		Guatemala	
	RSK	DSWA	REDSKIN	United States	
D3	DAO	Daallo Airlines	DALO AIRLINES	Djibouti	
N2	DAG	Dagestan Airlines	DAGAL	Russia	
	DHA	Dahla Airlines		Democratic Republic of Congo	
CA	CCD	Dalian Airlines	XIANGJIAN	China	
	DCS	DC Aviation	TWIN STAR	Germany	
	DCX	Daimler-Chrysler	DAIMLER	United States	
	DKA	Daka		Kazakhstan	
	DLR	Dala Air Services	DALA AIR	Nigeria	
H8	KHB	Dalavia	DALAVIA	Russia	
	DXP	Dallas Express Airlines	DALLAS EXPRESS	United States	
	DAS	Damascene Airways	AIRDAM	Syrian Arab Republic	
	DSA	Danbury Airways	DANBURY AIRWAYS	United States	
	DOP	Dancopter	DANCOPTER	Denmark	
	DAF	Danish Air Force	DANISH AIRFORCE	Denmark	
DD	DDL	Danish Air Lines		Denmark	defunct
	DAR	Danish Army	DANISH ARMY	Denmark	
	DNY	Danish Navy	DANISH NAVY	Denmark	
	DNU	Danu Oro Transportas	DANU	Lithuania	
	DRT	Darta	DARTA	France	
0D	DWT	Darwin Airline	DARWIN	Switzerland	
	DSQ	Dasab Airlines	DASAB AIR	Uganda	
	DSH	Dash Air Charter	DASH CHARTER	United States	
	GOB	Dash Aviation	PILGRIM	United Kingdom	
	DGX	Dasnair	DASNA	Switzerland	
	DAB	Dassault Aviation		France	
	CVF	Dassault Falcon Jet Corporation	CLOVERLEAF	United States	
	DSO	Dassault Falcon Service	DASSAULT	France	
	DTN	Data International	DATA AIR	Sudan	
	XDT	Date Transformation Corp		United States	
D5	DAU	Dauair	DAUAIR	Germany	
	DCO	David Crawshaw Consultants Limited		United Kingdom	
	DWN	Dawn Air	DAWN AIR	United States	
	DJS	DayJet	DAYJET	United States	
	DAY	Daya Aviation	DAYA	Sri Lanka	
	DHC	De Havilland	DEHAVILLAND	Canada	
	IAY	Deadalos Flugtbetriebs	IASON	Austria	
	DAA	Decatur Aviation	DECUR	United States	
	DKN	Deccan Charters	DECCAN	India	
	JDC	Deere & Company	JOHN DEERE	United States	
	DWR	Delaware Skyways	DELAWARE	United States	
	DEA	Delta Aerotaxi	JET SERVICE	Italy	
	SNO	Delta Air Charter	SNOWBALL	Canada	
	ELJ	Delta Private Jets	ELITE JET	United States	Changed to DPJ/JET CARD in 2014
DL	DAL	Delta Air Lines	DELTA	United States	
	KMB	Delta Engineering Aviation	KEMBLEJET	United Kingdom	
	DLI	Delta Express International	DELTA EXPRESS	Ukraine	
	DSU	Delta State University	DELTA STATE	United States	
J7	DNM	Denim Air	DENIM	Netherlands	Defunct
	FEC	Denver Express	FALCON EXPRESS	United States	
	DJT	Denver Jet	DENVER JET	United States	
	FGC	Departament d'Agricultura de la Generalitat de Catalunya	FORESTALS	Spain	
	DRY	Deraya Air Taxi	DERAYA	Indonesia	
	DRX	Des R Cargo Express		Mauritania	
	MIZ	Desarrollo Milaz	MILAZ	Mexico	
	DTY	Destiny Air Services	DESTINY	Sierra Leone	
2A		Deutsche Bahn		Germany	
1I	AMB	Deutsche Rettungsflugwacht	CIVIL AIR AMBULANCE	Germany	
	LFO	Deutsches Zentrum fur Luft-und Raumfahrt EV	LUFO	Germany	
	DIS	Di Air	DI AIR	Serbia	
	SPK	Diamond Aviation	SPARKLE	United States	
	DRB	Didier Rousset Buy	DIDIER	Chile	
	DGT	Digital Equipment Corporation	DIGITAL	United States	
	DIP	Diplomatic Freight Services	DIPFREIGHT	United Kingdom	
	ENA	Dirección General de Aviación Civil y Telecomunicasciones	ENA	Spain	
	DIA	Direct Air	BLUE SKY	United States	
	XAP	Direct Air trading as Midway Connection	MID-TOWN	United States	
	DCT	Direct Flight		United Kingdom	
	SXP	Direct Fly	EXPRESS SKY	Poland	defunct
AW	DIR	Dirgantara Air Service	DIRGANTARA	Indonesia	
	DCV	Discover Air	DISCOVER	United States	
4Y	OCN	Discover Airlines	OCEAN	Germany	Formerly branded Eurowings Discover
DH	DVA	Discovery Airways	DISCOVERY AIRWAYS	United States	
	XDS	Dispatch Services		United States	
	DIX	Dix Aviation	DIX FLIGHT	Germany	
	DEE	Dixie Airways	TACAIR	United States	
Z6	UDN	Dniproavia	DNIEPRO	Ukraine	
	FDN	Dolphin Air	FLYING DOLPHIN	United Arab Emirates	
	IXX	Dolphin Express Airlines	ISLAND EXPRESS	United States	
	DPL	Dome Petroleum	DOME	Canada	
YU	ADM	Dominair	DOMINAIR	Dominican Republic	defunct; former IATA code: SS; former name: Aerolíneas Dominicanas, ICAO code no longer allocated
	MYO	Dominguez Toledo (Grupo Mayoral)	MAYORAL	Spain	
DO	DOA	Dominicana de Aviación	DOMINICANA	Dominican Republic	defunct
E3	DMO	Domodedovo Airlines	DOMODEDOVO	Russia	defunct
	DVB	Don Avia	DONSEBAI	Kazakhstan	
	DON	Donair Flying Club	DONAIR	United Kingdom	
D9	DNV	Donavia	DONAVIA	Russia	formerly Aeroflot-Don
5D	UDC	DonbassAero	DONBASS AERO	Ukraine	
DZ	EPA	Donghai Airlines	DONGHAI AIR	China	
	DAD	Dorado Air	DORADO AIR	Dominican Republic	
	DOR	Dornier	DORNIER	Germany	
	DAV	Dornier Aviation Nigeria	DANA AIR	Nigeria	
	DOM	Dos Mundos	DOS MUNDOS	Dominican Republic	
	DCA	Dreamcatcher Airways	DREAM CATCHER	United Kingdom	
KB	DRK	Druk Air	ROYAL BHUTAN	Bhutan	
	DRE	Drummond Island Air	MICHIGAN	United States	
	DUB	Dubai Airwing	DUBAI	United Arab Emirates	
	DBK	Dubrovnik Air	SEAGULL	Croatia	
	DUK	Ducair	LION KING	Luxembourg	
	DBJ	Duchess of Brittany (Jersey) Limited	DUCHESS	United Kingdom	
	LPD	UK Royal/HRH Duke of York	LEOPARD	United Kingdom	
	DUN	Dun'Air	DUNAIR	Mauritania	
	PHD	Duncan Aviation	PANHANDLE	United States	
	VVF	Dunyaya Bakis Hava Tasimaciligi	WORLDFOCUS	Turkey	
	DUO	Duo Airways	FLY DUO	United Kingdom	
	DJE	Durango Jet	DURANGO JET	Mexico	
	DNL	Dutch Antilles Express	DUTCH ANTILLES	Netherlands Antilles	
	DCE	Dutch Caribbean Express	DUTCH CARIBBEAN	Netherlands Antilles	
	DBR	Dutchbird	DUTCHBIRD	Netherlands	ICAO code allocated to another company, call sign no longer allocated
	DBR	Dobrolet	DOBROLET	Russia	Defunct, ICAO code still allocated (2017)
	DFS	Dwyer Aircraft Services	DWYAIR	United States	
	XDY	Dynair Services		United States	
	DNR	Dynamair Aviation	DYNAMAIR	Canada	
	DYE	Dynamic Air	DYNAMIC	Netherlands	ICAO code and call sign no longer allocated
	DYA	Dynamic Airways	DYNAMIC AIR	United States	
DI	BAG	Dba	SPEEDWAY	Germany	Merged into Air Berlin
HO	DKH	Juneyao Air	AIR JUNEYAO	China	

== IATA Traffic Conference Areas ==
The International Air Transport Association (IATA) divides the world into three areas called the Traffic Conference Areas (TCAs) for air travel purposes. These areas are used to define geographical boundaries for fare construction and other industry-related practices:

- Traffic Conference Area 1 (TC1) – this area includes the Americas, encompassing North America (the Caribbean, Central America, and Northern America) and South America.
- Traffic Conference Area 2 (TC2) – this area includes the EMEA region, encompassing Europe, the Middle East, and Africa (North Africa and Sub-Saharan Africa).
- Traffic Conference Area 3 (TC3) – this area includes the Asia–Pacific region, encompassing the rest of Asia (Central Asia, East Asia, North Asia, South Asia, and Southeast Asia) and Oceania.

Essentially, TC1 covers the "New World", while TC2 and TC3 together cover the "Old World" (Africa-Eurasia) and the "Land Down Under".

== See also ==
- IATA airport code
- ICAO airport code
