= WDNY =

WDNY may refer to:

- United States District Court for the Western District of New York
- WDNY (AM), a radio station (1400 AM) licensed to serve Dansville, New York, United States
- WDXT, a radio station (93.9 FM) licensed to serve Dansville, New York, which held the call sign WDNY-FM from 1992 to 2013 and 2017 to 2025

== See also ==
- Udny (disambiguation)
- KDNY-LP
- DNY (disambiguation)
