= Deutsche Schule Helsinki =

Coordinates: 60°10′02″N 24°55′55″E

Deutsche Schule Helsinki (DSH)
- Helsingin Saksalainen koulu Tyska skolan i Helsingfors
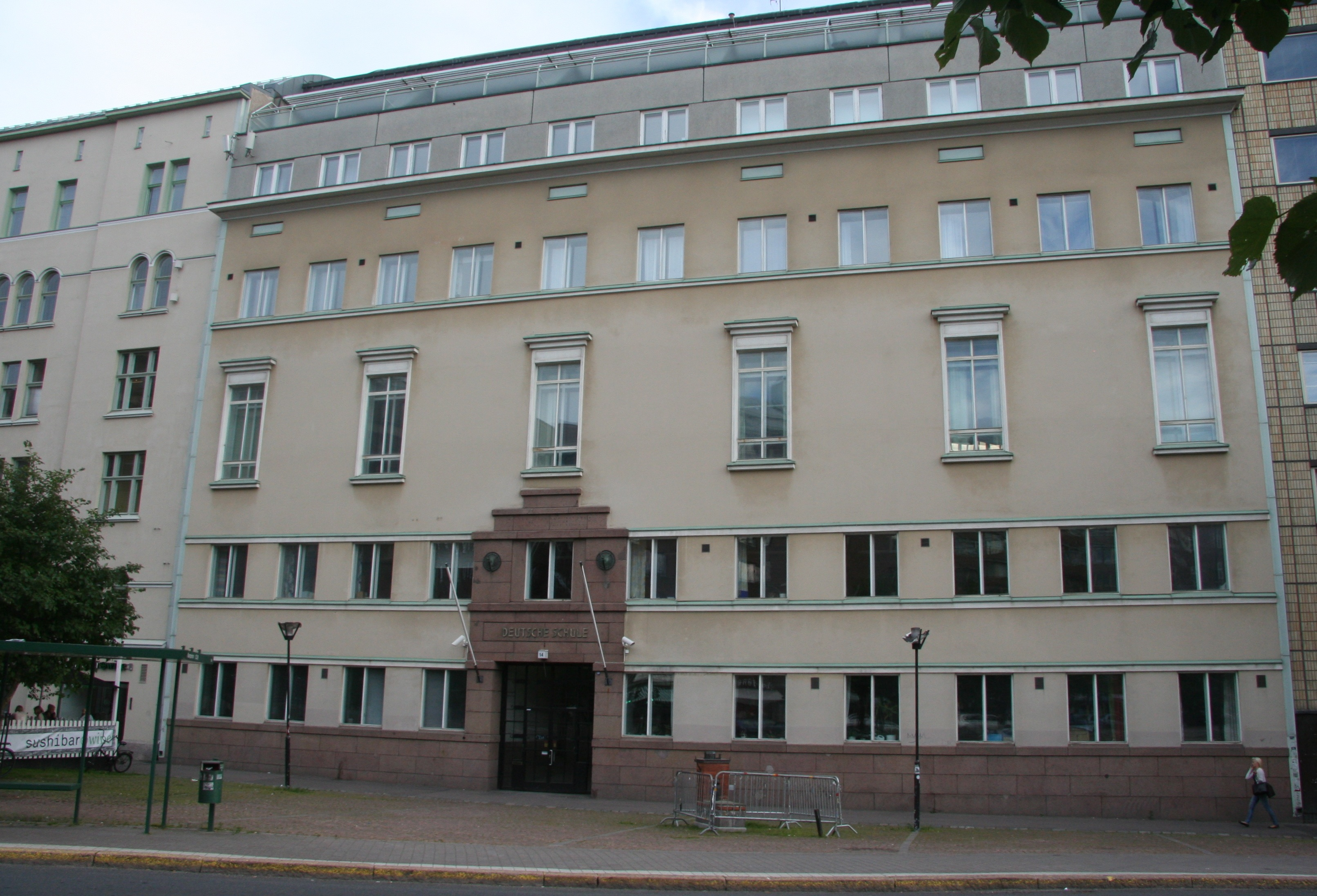
- Kamppi, Helsinki; Finland

Information
- Type: Private
- Established: 1881
- Principal: Saga Sjölund
- Grades: 1–12
- Enrollment: 600
- Language: German, Finnish
- Website: www.dsh.fi

Deutsche Schule Helsinki (DSH; German for "German school Helsinki", Finnish: Helsingin Saksalainen koulu, Swedish: Tyska skolan i Helsingfors) is a partly bilingual, German and Finnish-speaking school in Helsinki, the capital of Finland. It is a member of the German Schools Abroad Network DAS.

It was founded in 1881 through funding from German consul Freiherr Ferdinand von Lamezan, wealthy German families, and the Protestant Church. It was originally held in various private apartments, but now has its own facilities in Kamppi.

The school is open to everyone with an interest in the German language. In the past, most of its students were children of German families living in Finland. 80% of its students are now Finnish citizens.

The schools programs include compulsory German and English, and voluntary Swedish, French, Latin and Russian. Students may decide in 7th grade if they want to study Swedish or French. Latin is available from the 8th grade.

DSH offers two paths of education from grades 1–9, with either Finnish or German as the language of instruction. Senior high school education (10th–12th grade Oberstufe) is also offered in German, culminating with the Reifeprüfung der Deutschen Schule Helsinki, which entitles graduates to enroll at a university in Finland or Germany.
