= Sähkötalo =

Office building in Helsinki, Finland, designed by Alvar Aalto

Coordinates: 60°10′06″N 24°55′50″E

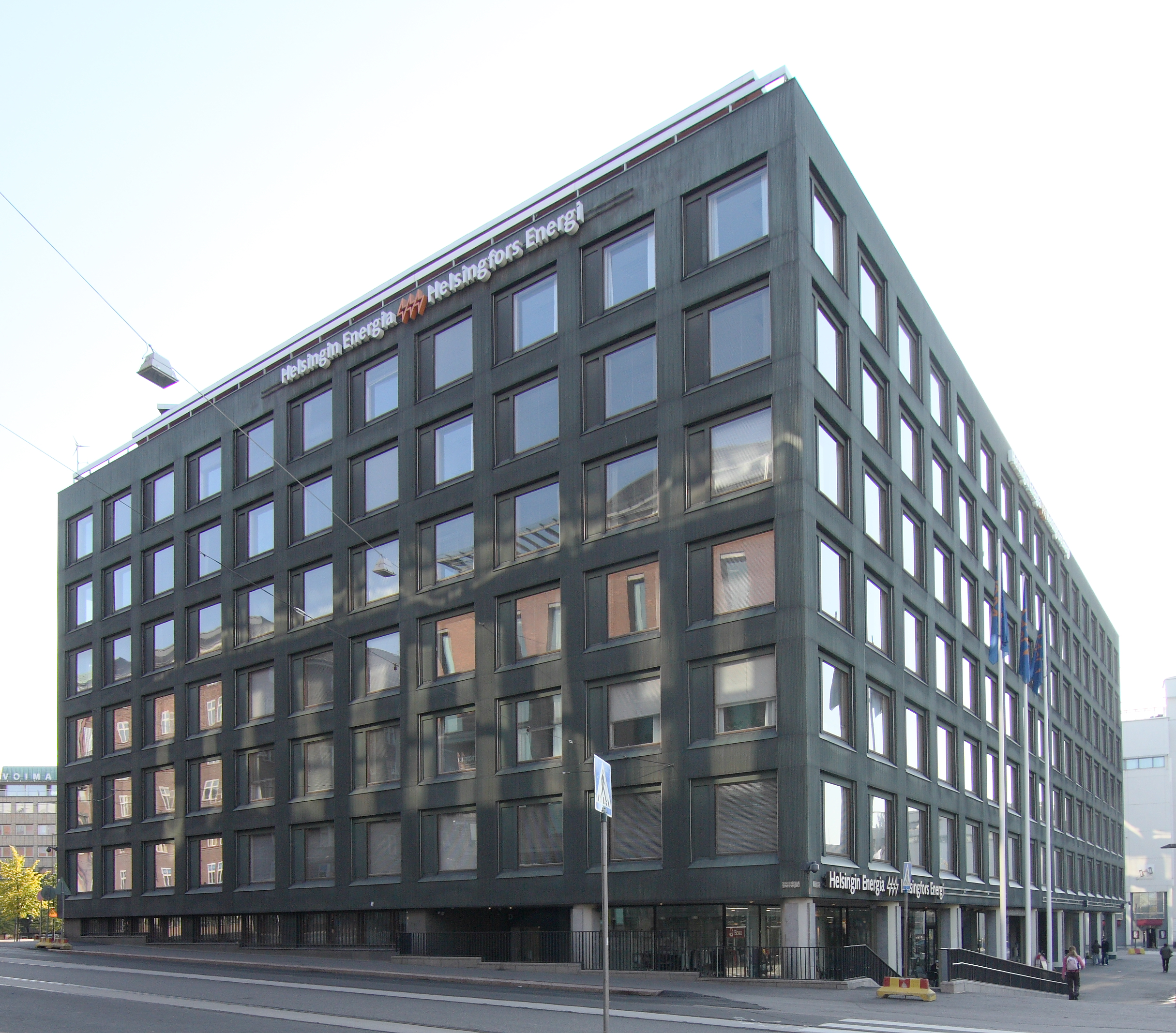
Sähkötalo

Sähkötalo (lit. Electricity Building) (Swedish: Elhuset) is the name of the building located in the Kamppi district of central Helsinki, which serves as the headquarters of HELEN, the municipal energy company of the city of Helsinki.

The building was designed by Alvar Aalto. Construction started in March 1970, and the building was ready for occupation on January 22, 1973. Since October 2007, the bottom floors of the building have been home to stores accessible from Kamppi Center by an underground pedestrian tunnel running underneath Fredrikinkatu. The window frames of the building are lined with neon lights that slowly change colour throughout the night.
