= Udney =

Udney is both a given name and surname. Notable people with the name include:

- Robert Udny or Udney (1725–1802), Scottish merchant and art collector
- Udney Hay (1739–1806), soldier during the American Revolutionary War
- Udney Richardson (1869–1943), Canadian politician

== Places ==
- Udney, a community in Ramara, Ontario, Canada

== See also ==
- Udny (disambiguation)
