= Udny =

Udny may refer to:

- Udny Station, a small village in Aberdeenshire, Scotland
- Udny Green, a hamlet in Aberdeenshire, Scotland
- Clan Udny, a Scottish clan from Aberdeenshire, Scotland
- Udny Yule (1871–1951), British statistician

== See also ==
- Udney, a given name and surname
- Undy, a village in Monmouthshire, south east Wales
- EDNY (disambiguation)
- WDNY (disambiguation)
