= Helsinki Synagogue =

Synagogue in Helsinki, Finland

Coordinates: 60°10′03″N 24°55′42″E

Helsinki Synagoga
- Finnish: Helsingin synagoga Swedish: Helsingfors synagoga
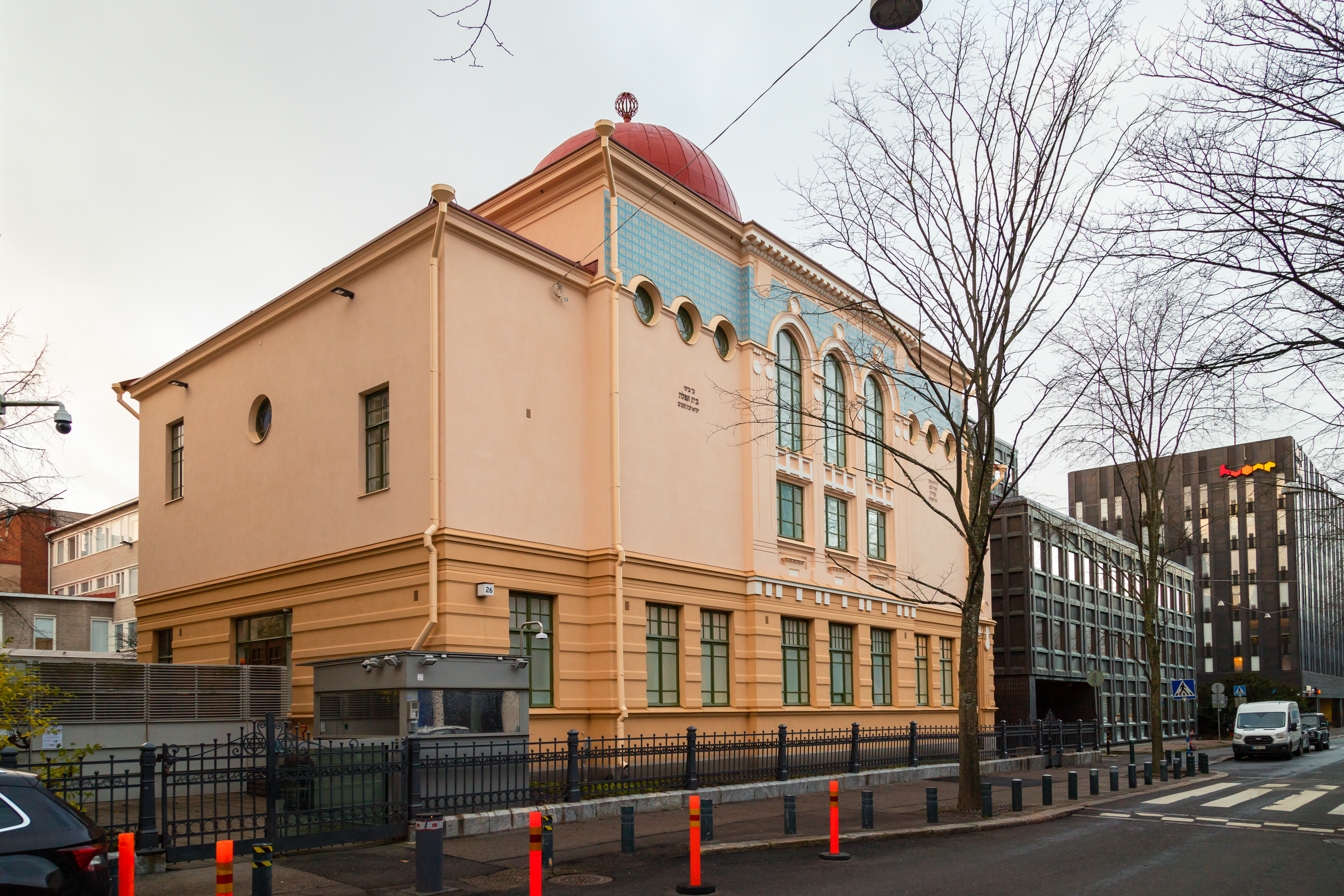
- The synagogue in 2020

- Location of the synagogue in Finland

Religion
- Affiliation: Orthodox Judaism
- Rite: Nusach Ashkenaz
- Ecclesiastical or organizational status: Synagogue
- Status: Active

Location
- Location: Malminkatu Street 26, Kamppi, Helsinki
- Country: Finland
- Interactive map of Helsinki Synagoga

Architecture
- Architect: Jac. Ahrenberg
- Type: Synagogue architecture
- Style: Byzantine Revival; Art Nouveau
- Established: c. 1900 (as a congregation)
- Completed: 1906

Specifications
- Capacity: 600 worshippers
- Dome: One
- Materials: Brick

The Helsinki Synagogue (Finnish: Helsingin synagoga; Swedish: Helsingfors synagoga) is an Orthodox Jewish synagogue, located at Malminkatu Street 26, in the Kamppi district of Helsinki, Finland.

== Overview ==
The rectangular synagogue building, designed in the Byzantine Revival and Art Nouveau styles by the Viipuri-born architect, Jac. Ahrenberg, was completed in August 1906 and serves the 1,200-strong Jewish community. The synagogue dome is a distinctive landmark on the Helsinki skyline, and was renovated and enlarged in 1926, when a library was added. A Jewish community center, located adjacent to the synagogue, including an aged care facility, an auditorium, meeting rooms, and a mikveh, was completed in 1967.

Based on information from 2025, the Helsinki Synagogue regularly hosts a few dozen worshipers during ceremonies and prepares vegetarian meals for Shabbat celebrated there.

As one of the most northern in the world, the congregation follows the halachic hour, especially during Finnish summers where it doesn't get dark, even at night. Under rabbinic Jewish law, an hour is calculated by taking the total time of daylight of a particular day, from sunrise until sunset, and dividing it into twelve equal parts. The halachic hour varies by the season and sometimes by the day. As a result, shabbat services are conducted during daylight.

== Gallery ==
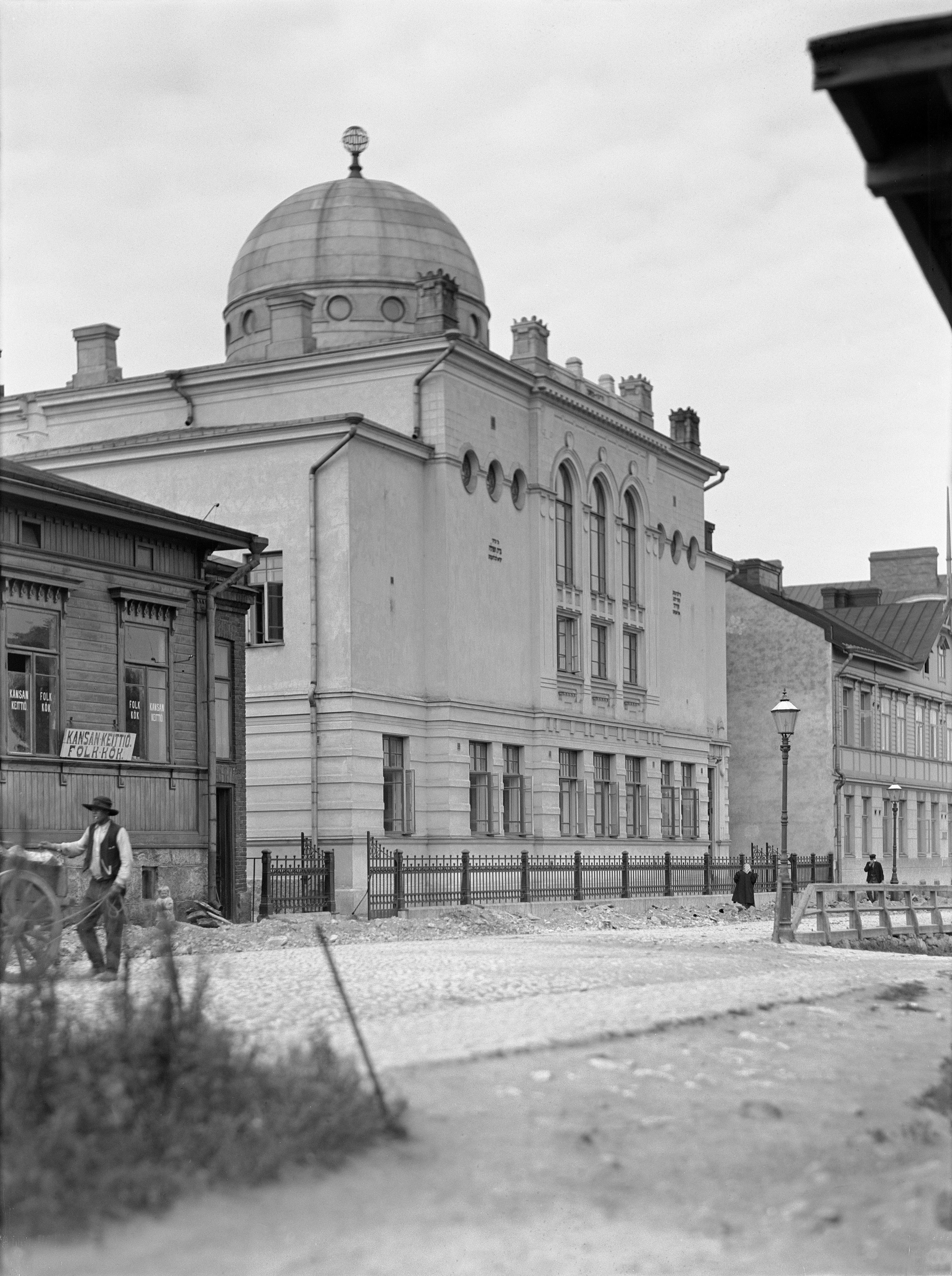
Helsinki synagogue, 1908

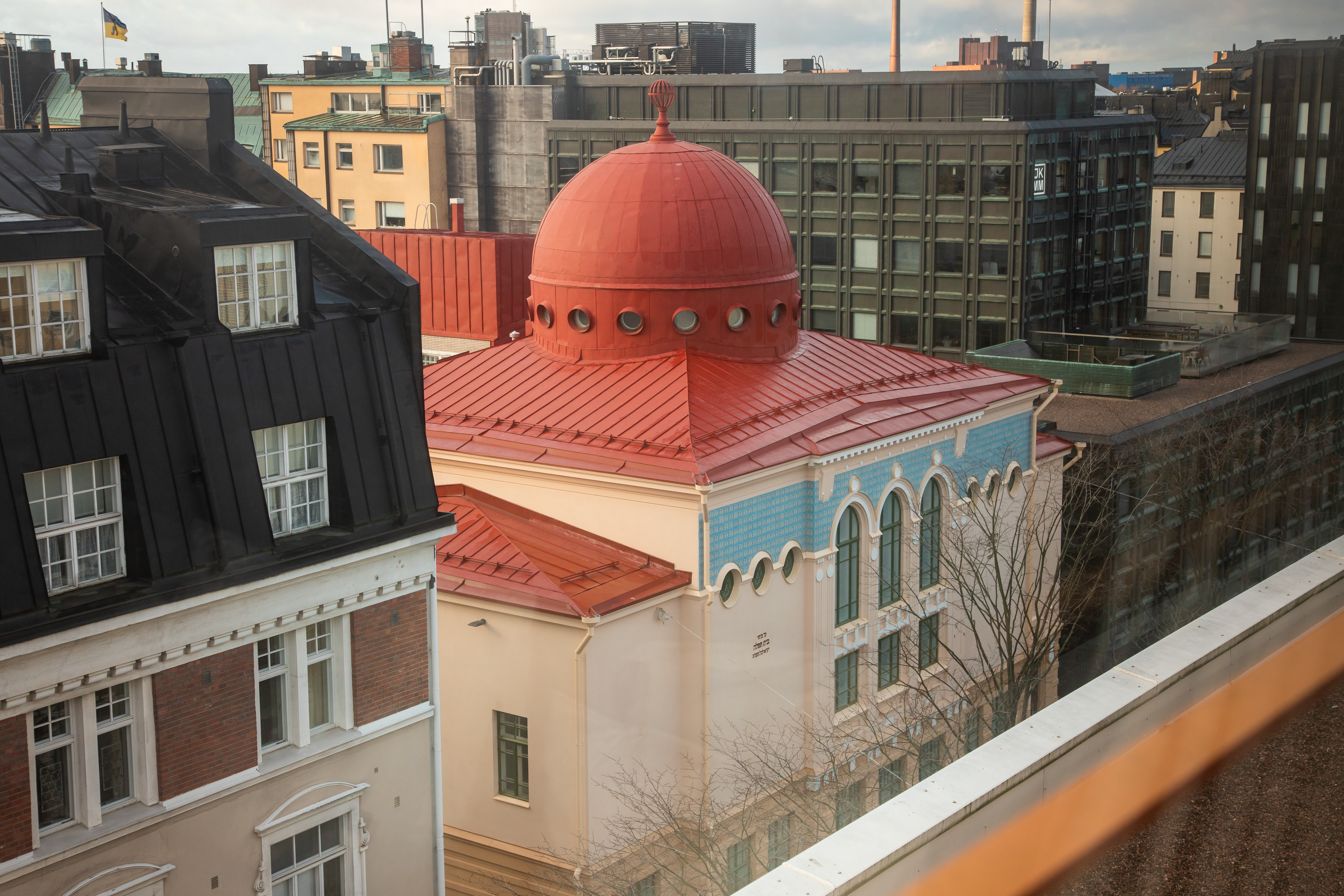
Helsinki synagogue, 2020

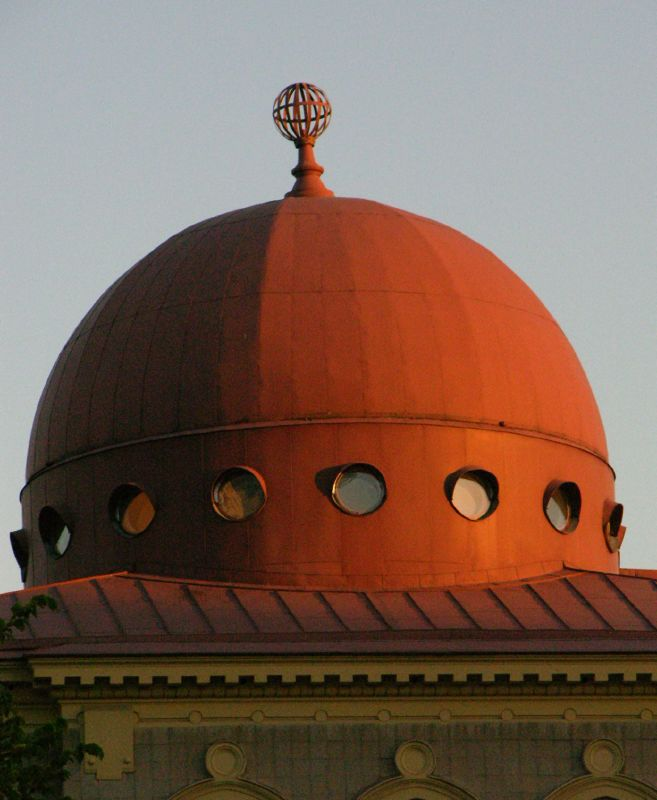
The dome in 2006

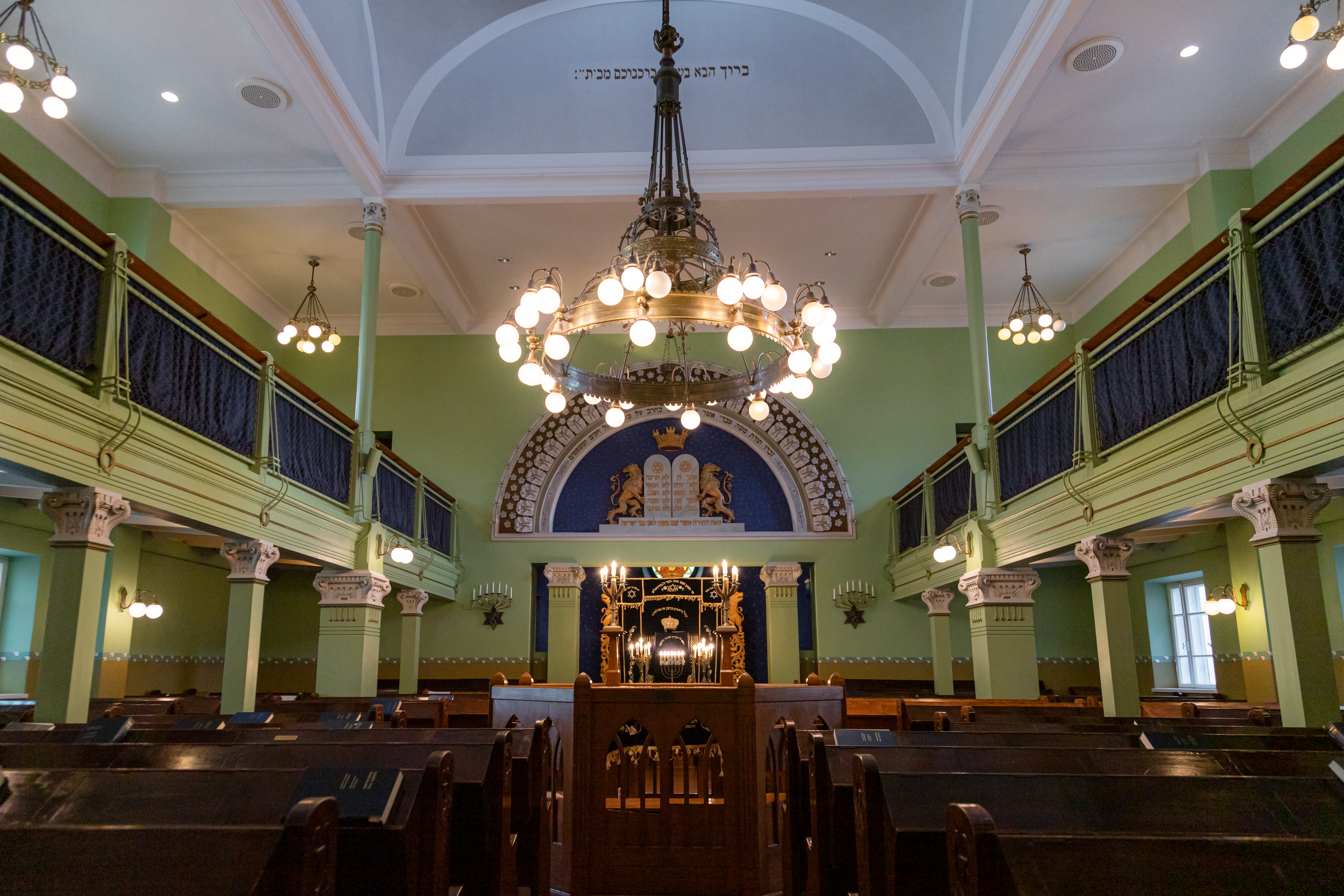
Interior view

== See also ==
- History of the Jews in Finland
