= Diocese of New York =

A diocese is the basic regional unit of many churches. The Diocese of New York (each headed by a Bishop of New York) may refer to:

- Episcopal Diocese of New York
- Orthodox Church in America Diocese of New York and New Jersey
- Roman Catholic Archdiocese of New York
