= Dynamic Airlines =

Netherlands charter airline

IATA	ICAO	Call sign
—	DYE	DYNAMIC
- Founded: 1980
- Ceased operations: 2006
- Hubs: Rotterdam Airport
- Fleet size: 6
- Destinations: 7
- Headquarters: Netherlands
- Employees: 7,000

Dynamic Airlines was a small Dutch charter airline for business, medical and rapid small cargo flights and was founded in 1980, operating mainly from Rotterdam Airport. Their callsign was DYNAMIC, formerly DYNAMITE. In 2006, the airline ceased all operations.

== Fleet ==
The fleet of Dynamic Airlines consisted of six aircraft, including:

Dynamic Airlines fleet
Aircraft	Total
Cessna Citation	3
Fairchild Merlin	1
Piper Navajo Chieftain	1
Cessna 172	1

== Incidents and Accidents ==
- In September 2005, a Fairchild Metroliner registered PH-DYM of Dynamic Airlines ran off the runway at Rotterdam Airport during take-off causing the landing gear to collapse, leaving the aircraft badly damaged. There were no casualties, but the aircraft was written off.
