= DSHS =

DSHS may refer to:

== High schools ==
- Daejeon Science High School in South Korea
- Daegu Science High School in South Korea
- Davis Senior High School in California
- Dover-Sherborn High School in Massachusetts
- Dripping Springs High School in Texas
- Dublin Scioto High School in Ohio
- Duncraig Senior High School in Western Australia

== Other ==
- Devil Sold His Soul, a British metalcore band
- State of Slovenes, Croats and Serbs (Serbo-Croatian Latin: Država Slovenaca, Hrvata i Srba)
- Texas Department of State Health Services
- Washington Department of Social and Health Services
