= Elixia =

Fitness center chain

ELIXIA Nordic AS
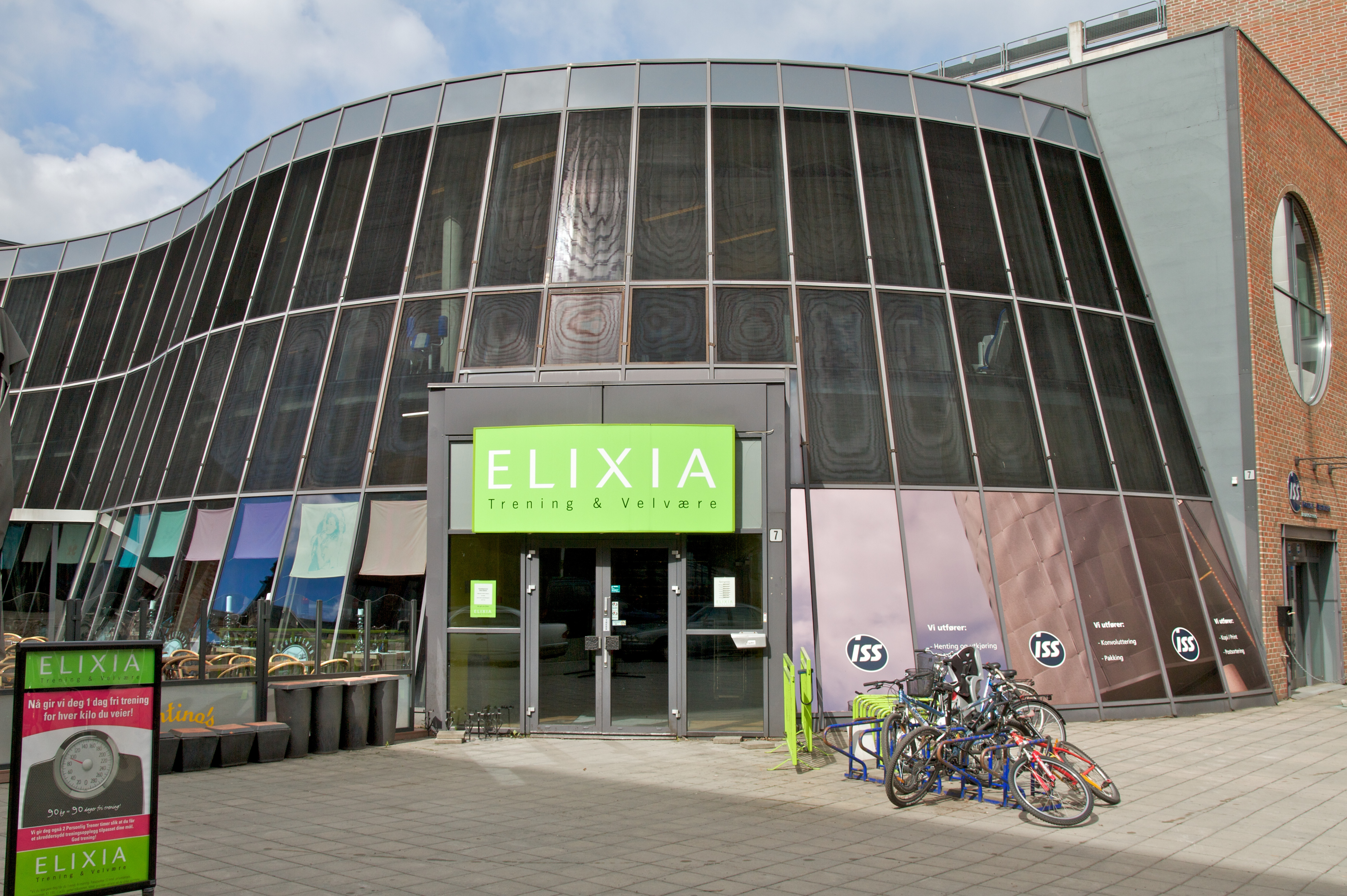
- Company type: Private
- Industry: Health and fitness
- Founded: 2001
- Defunct: 2014
- Fate: Merged with SATS and Fresh Fitness to form SATS ELIXIA (now SATS Group)
- Successor: SATS ASA
- Headquarters: Karenslyst allé 7, Oslo, Norway
- Area served: Norway, Finland, Sweden
- Key people: Ståle Angel (CEO, 2002–2013)
- Products: Fitness memberships, personal training, group exercise
- Revenue: ▲NOK 900 million (2011)
- Owner: Altor (2011–2014); Norvestor (2001–2011)
- Number of employees: ~3,700 (2011)
- Website: www.elixia.no (archived)

Elixia was a Nordic chain of fitness centers that offered strength training, cardio and weight training, and different types of classes, such as aerobics, dance, fitness, martial arts, yoga and cycling hours.

ELIXIA Holding AS was the parent company ELIXIA's operations, and the majority shareholder was Altor Fund III. In 2010, Elixia reported a revenue of NOK 900 million. Elixia Norway had 37 centers, Finland 14 and Sweden three centers. In total Elixia had about 3,700 employees and 155,000 members (2012).

In 2014, Elixia merged with the Norwegian fitness center chain SATS, going under the name SATS ELIXIA. The new group would have more than 2,000 employees, a total revenue of approximately NOK 2.5 billion, and 181 fitness centers with almost 500,000 members.
