= Runeberginkatu =

Street in Helsinki, Finland

Coordinates: 60.17468°N 24.92227°E

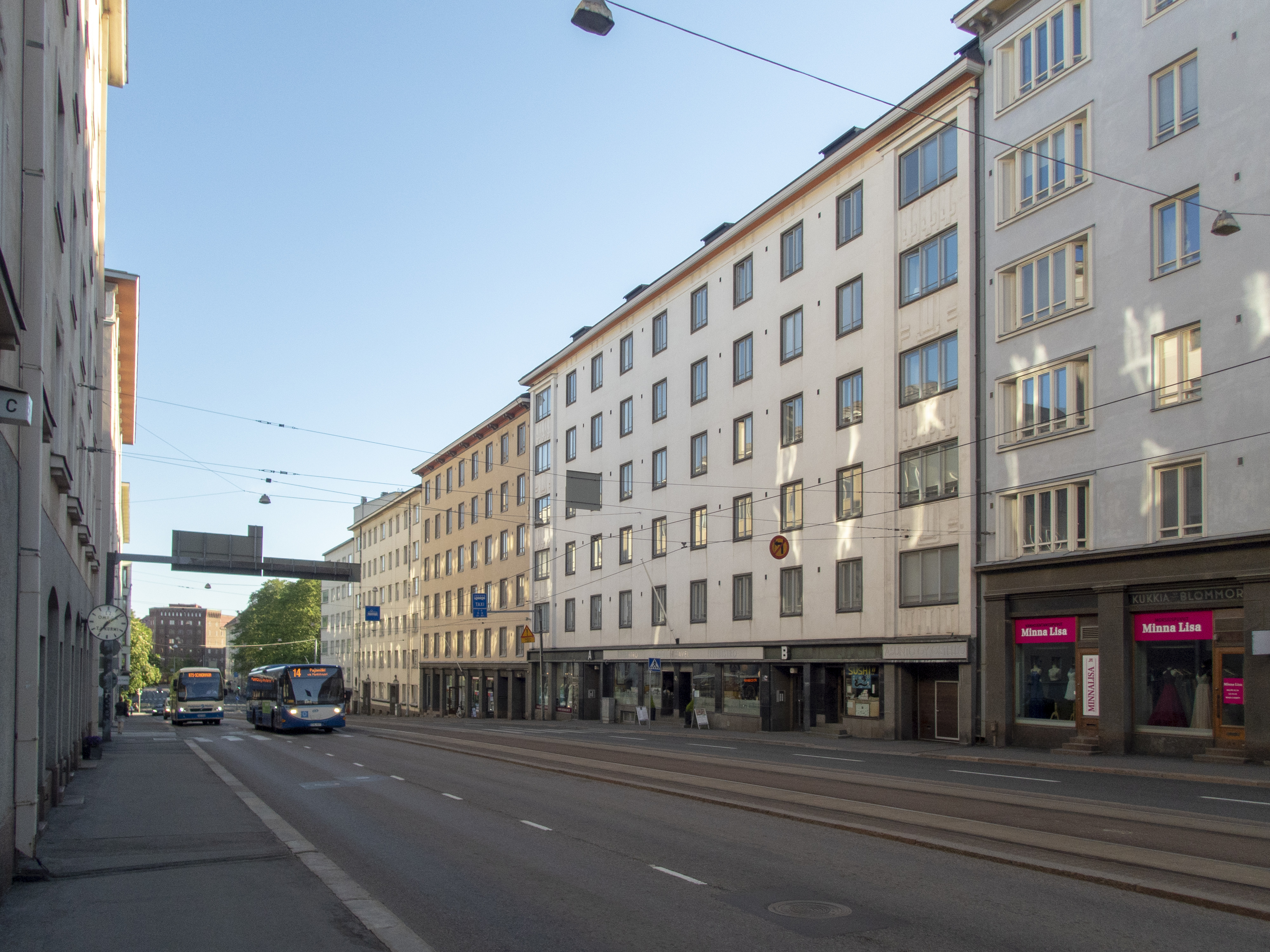
Runeberginkatu, between Hesperia Esplanade and Töölöntori

Runeberginkatu (Swedish: Runebergsgatan) is a major street in central Helsinki, Finland. Starting from Kampintori, it runs in a sweeping arc broadly northwards for approximately 1.8 kilometres (1.1 mi) through the districts of Kamppi and Töölö, via Töölöntori square, terminating at a junction with Mannerheimintie by the Finnish National Opera.

The street is named after Johan Ludvig Runeberg, the national poet of Finland. The name first appears in a map from 1892, initially as 'Runebergkatu', and was changed in 1928 to its current format.

Sections of the street carry tram traffic (as of January 2021, routes 1, 2 and 8).

Major intersections of Runeberginkatu include:

- Arkadiankatu
- Museokatu
- Hesperia Esplanade
- Topeliuksenkatu
- Mannerheimintie

Notable buildings along the street include the Swedish-language Hanken School of Economics, on the corner with Arkadiankatu. The Finnish-language business school, Helsinki School of Economics and Business Administration, was also located nearby, before becoming a part of the newly formed Aalto University and moving to the latter's Otaniemi campus.
