= Dallas Express Airlines =

Defunct American airline, 1993–1995

IATA	ICAO	Call sign
—	DXP	DALLAS EXPRESS
- Founded: 1993; 32 years ago
- Ceased operations: 1995; 30 years ago
- Operating bases: Dallas, Texas
- Headquarters: Texas, United States

Dallas Express Airlines was an American airline headquartered in Texas and in operation from 1993 until its closure due to bankruptcy in 1995.

== History ==
The airline was established in July 1993 by a Parker County, Texas, pilot and real estate developer, with service initially planned to cities including Dallas, Abilene, Waco, Midland, and Austin. The first flights began in April 1994, with the airline "serving Waco, Midland, Abilene, and Longview".

One report noted that "the airline flew in 1994, was grounded, flew again in 1995, then went under financially in October that year". During its period of operation, the airline was "plagued with equipment problems that regularly grounded its planes". Nevertheless, the airline served several Texas cities that had previously been underserved or unserved by air travel, with the airline's 1995 operations providing Galveston, Texas, with the first commuter air service in that city in twelve years. By the summer of 1995, the airline had also established service to Alpine, Texas.

The failure of the airline was cited as an example of asserted mismanagement on the part of the Longview Economic Development Corporation, which provided the airline with a $135,000 grant and a $200,000 loan guarantee in November 1993. A 1996 effort to revive the airline's operations in Abilene, Texas, failed due to the inability of the company to secure an insurance policy, prompting Beechcraft to revoke the provision of two aircraft to the company.
