= Kamppi =

Coordinates: 60°10′03″N 24°55′54″E

Kamppi Kampen
- Helsinki Subdivision
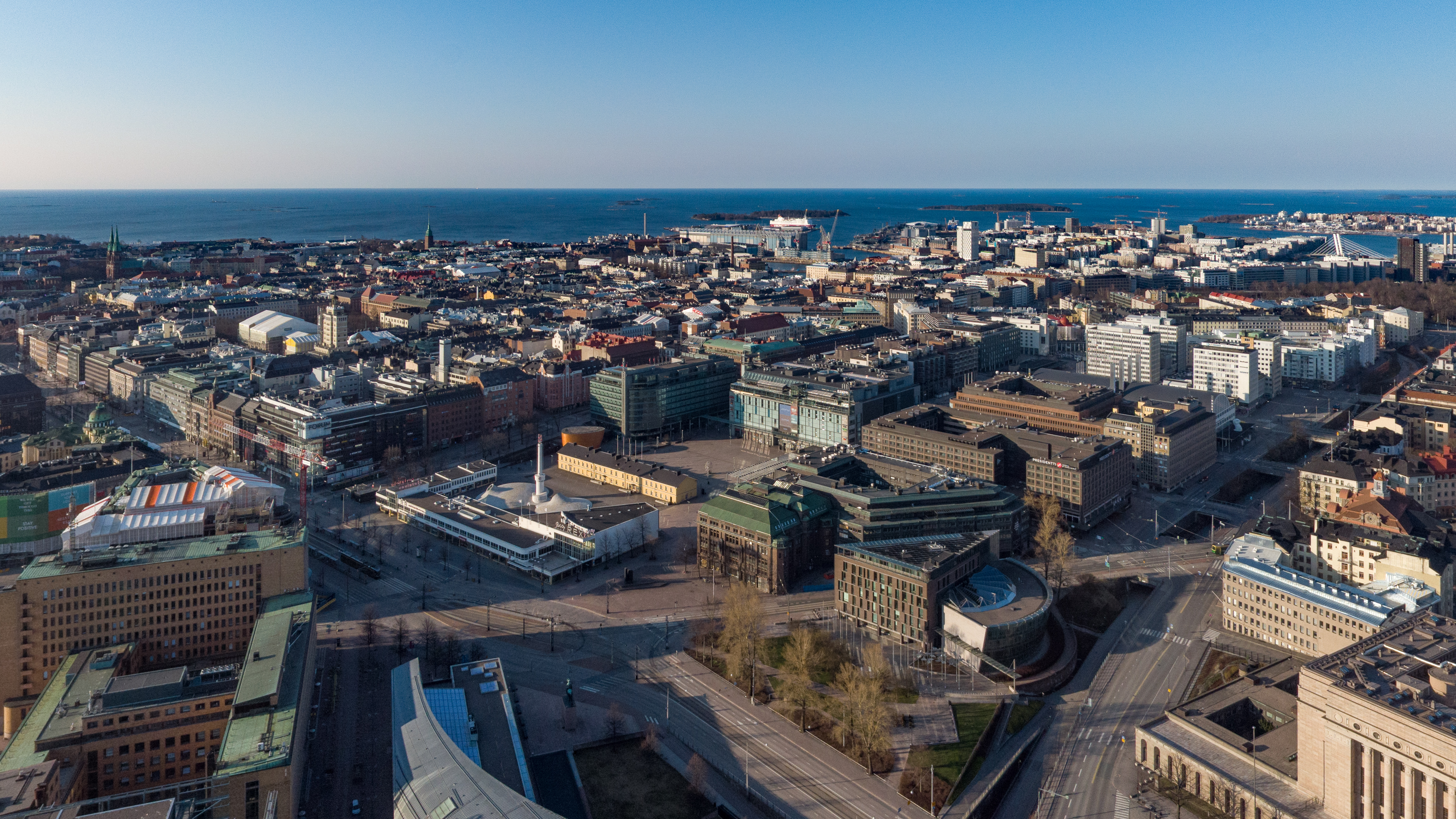

- Position of Kamppi within Helsinki
- Country: Finland
- Region: Uusimaa
- Sub-region: Greater Helsinki
- Municipality: Helsinki
- District: Southern
- Subdivision regions: none
- Area: 0.94 km^{2} (0.36 sq mi)
- Population (2020): 12,405
  - Density: 13,197/km^{2} (34,180/sq mi)
- Postal codes: 00100, 00120, 00180
- Subdivision number: 04
- Neighbouring subdivisions: Etu-Töölö; Kluuvi; Jätkäsaari; Kaartinkaupunki; Lapinlahti; Punavuori; Ruoholahti

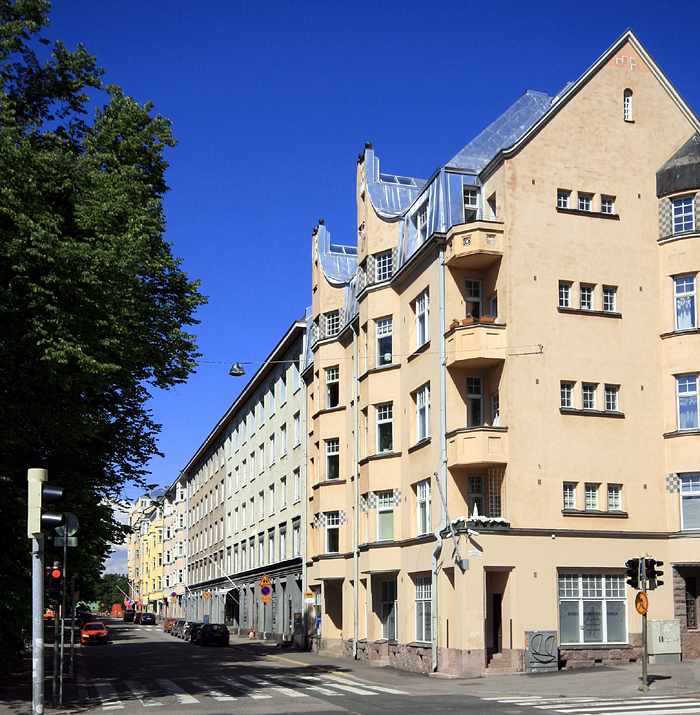
Lapinlahdenkatu street in Kamppi

Kamppi (Swedish: Kampen) is a neighbourhood in the centre of Helsinki, the capital of Finland. The name originally referred to a small area known as the "Kamppi field" (see below), but according to the current official designation, "Kamppi" encompasses a much larger area with a population of 12,098 people (as of 31 December 2022) and 28,181 jobs (as of 31 December 2012).

In common parlance today, the name "Kamppi" is often used to refer only to the northernmost part of Kamppi, containing the Kamppi Center shopping centre, the Kamppi metro station and the Tennispalatsi and Sähkötalo buildings.

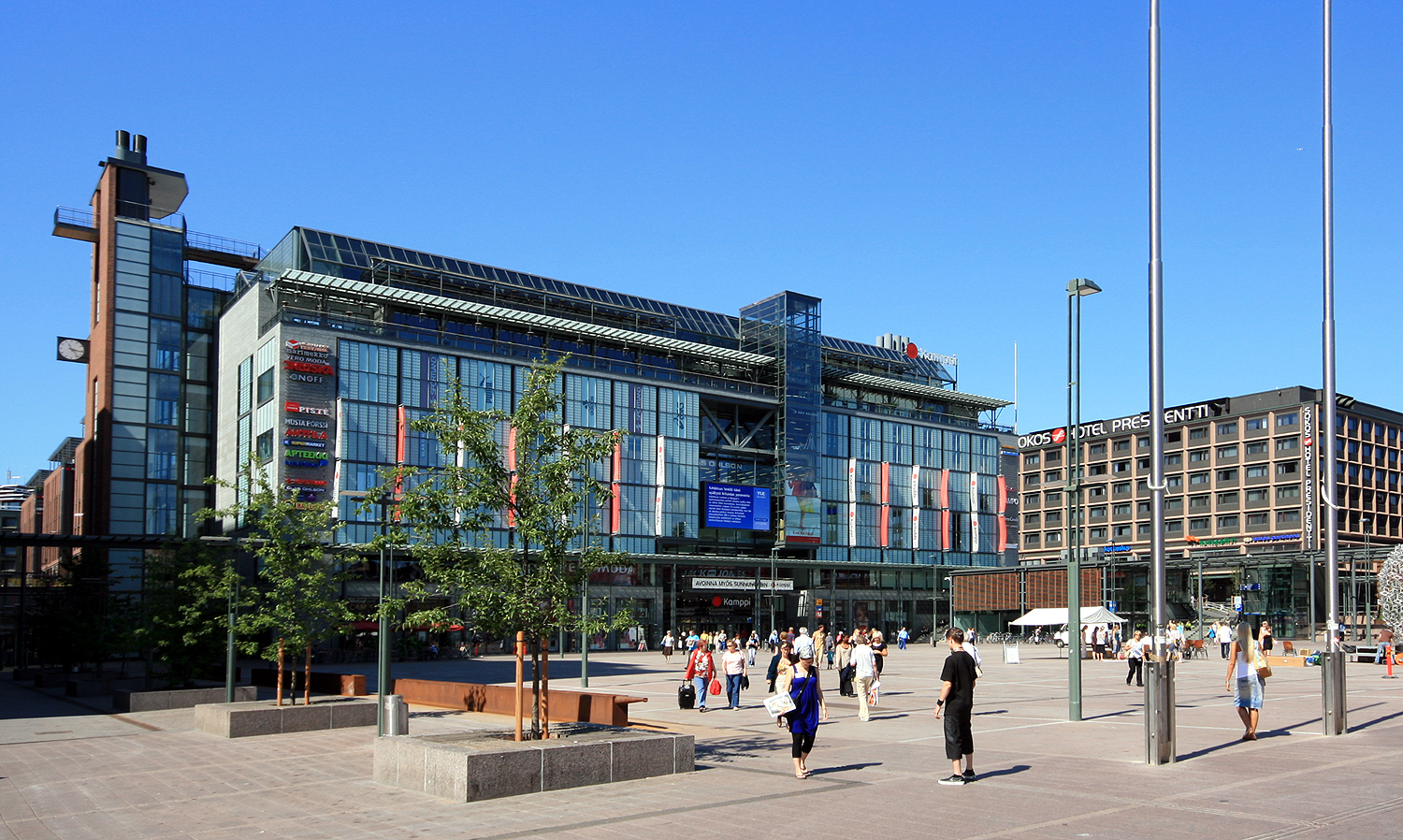
Entrance from Narinkkatori to the Kamppi shopping center, the new underground bus terminal and metro station are located underneath the building.

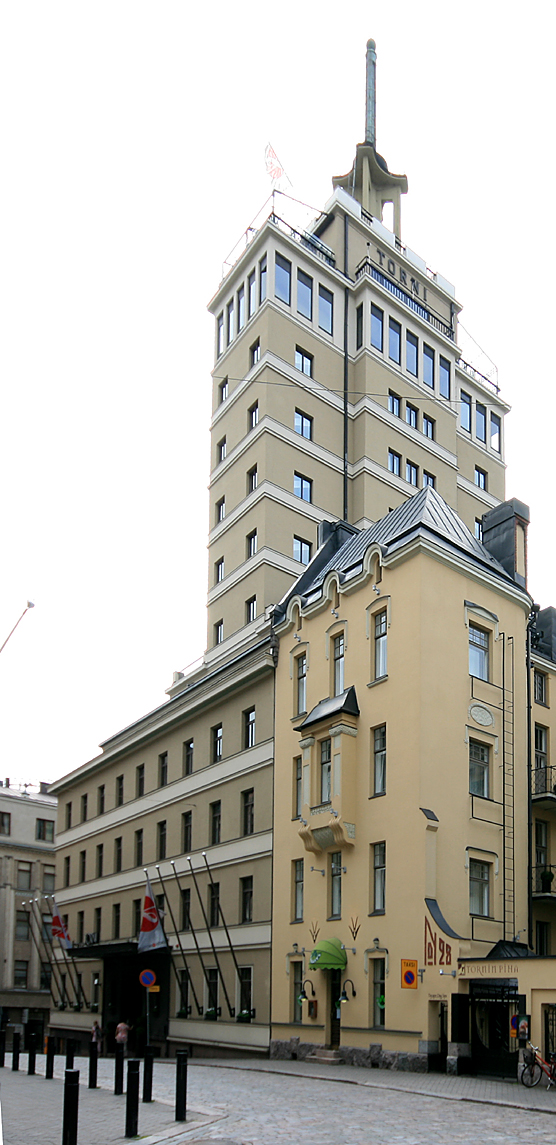
The legendary Hotel Torni (Hotel Tower), formerly the tallest building in Finland.

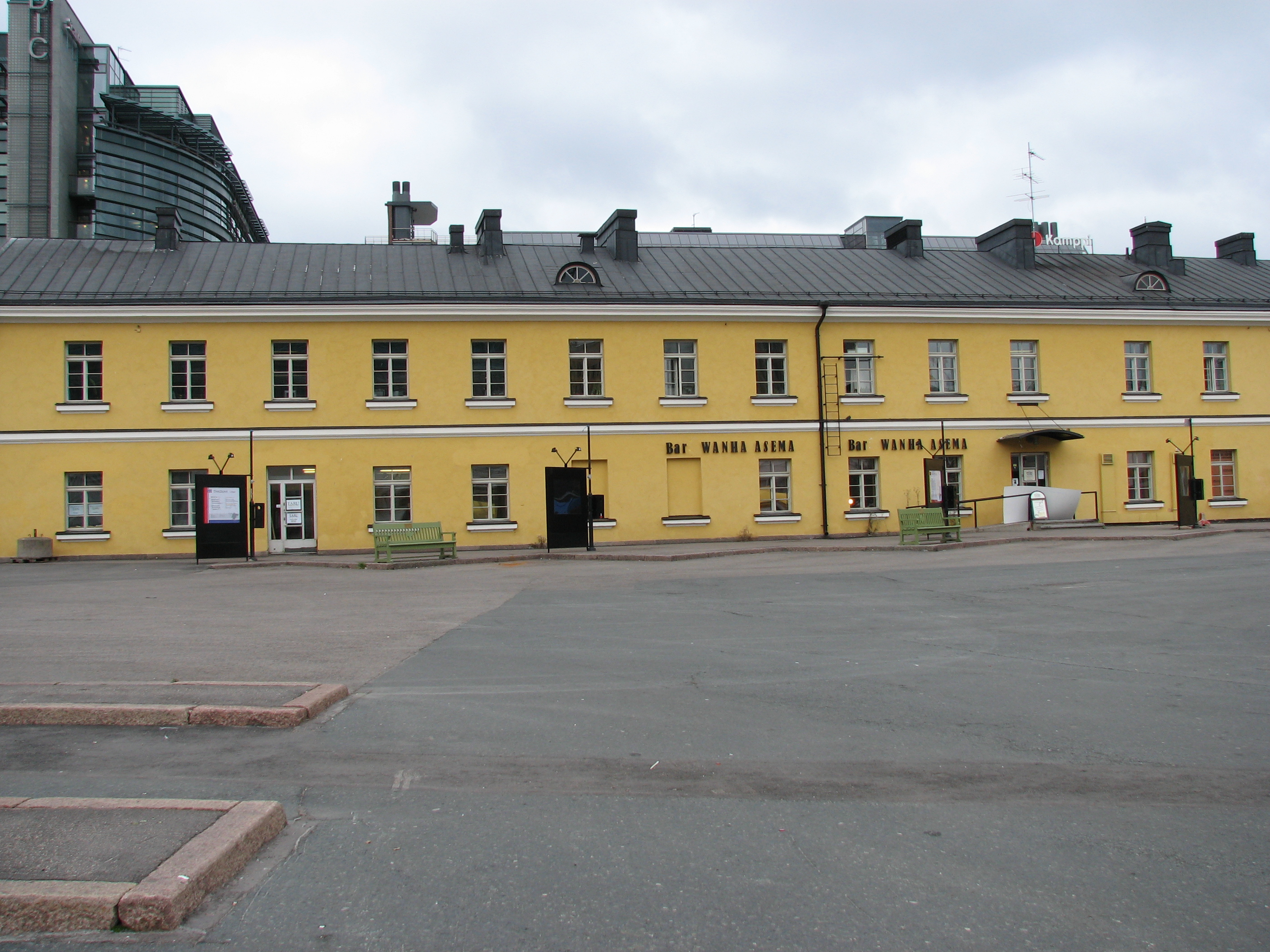
Service building of the Turku barracks that later served as the Helsinki central bus station

The heart of Kamppi is a part of the Central Business District. However, in stark contrast to the other districts of central Helsinki, development in Kamppi was sporadic and the very centre of Kamppi remained entirely undeveloped until 2002.

== Name ==
The name "Kamppi" is derived from the Swedish word for battle, kamp. Under Russian rule in the 19th century, Kamppi was mainly used as a military area by Russian forces, with barracks and training fields, which the name refers to. This so-called "Kamppi field" in the centre of Kamppi was also the location of a market run by Jewish merchants from the late 19th century until 1929 when it was shut down. A new pedestrian plaza on the same site, completed in 2005 as part of a recent redevelopment project, has been officially named Narinkka Square (Finnish: Narinkkatori, Swedish: Narinken) which comes from the name that the old Jewish market had. The name for the Jewish market has its background in the Russian language, as many of the Jewish merchants came from Russia and spoke Russian. In Russian language, "на рынке" (na rinke) means "on the market". The Finnish speaking people began to call the place "narinkka" and the name stuck to the place with few people today knowing the original meaning of the word.

== History ==
=== Military practice grounds and cemetery ===
During Swedish rule, the city of Helsinki's western edge was at the Kluuvinlahti bay, which stretched from the current-day Töölönlahti bay to the Esplanadi park. The Imperial Russian Army used the Kamppi field as practice grounds since the late 1820s and a garrison was situated around it. The Kamppi area to the west of Töölönlahti was almost uninhabited at the time.

The Turku barracks designed by Carl Ludvig Engel was built at the edge of the area along the street Läntinen Henrikinkatu at the location of the current Lasipalatsi building in 1833. At the time of its completion it was one of the largest buildings in Helsinki. Later, a group of wood and brick barracks buildings was built also on the other side of the practice grounds, at the site of the current Tennispalatsi and Autotalo buildings on either side of the street Fredrikinkatu.

A cemetery was located at the site of the current Old Church Park, where over a thousand Helsinkians who had died of the plague were buried in large mass graves after the 1710 plague epidemic. There were also fields and gardens belonging to Helsinkians at the Kamppi area. The master braider Röök had a rope braiding shop at the site of the current Erottaja square in the 18th century.

=== Suburb for Uusimaa ===
In the early 19th century the Kluuvinlahti bay was filled in and urban settlement started to spread into Kamppi. The zoning plan of Johan Albrecht Ehrenström designated Kamppi as the fourth (IV) district of Helsinki, part of the Uusimaa suburban area. The street Bulevardi became the main street of the district, leading from Erottaja to the Hietalahdentori market square. The old cemetery along the street was changed into a park, where the Helsinki Old Church was built in 1826. The streets at the district were named after famous people. The most famous Orthodox saints in Russia, namely Anna, Andreas, Vladimir and George (Yrjö), all got streets named after them. The street Albertinkatu was named after the zoning planner Johan Albrecht Ehrenström himself. Other streets in the district named after people include Abrahaminkatu, Eerikinkatu and Fredrikinkatu, whose namesakes are uncertain, but the street Eerikinkatu is thought to be named in honour of count Carl Erik Mannerheim, great-grandfather of Marshal of Finland Carl Gustaf Emil Mannerheim. After Finnish independence, the street names named after Andreas and Vladimir were removed as "too Russian" and replaced with more the nationalistic names Lönnrotinkatu and Kalevankatu.

The Bulevardi street and the areas near the Old Church Park were among the residential areas for the rich upper class in the 19th century. For example, the architect Carl Ludvig Engel lived at Bulevardi 18 in a luxurious wooden house he had designed himself.

=== Residential area for the poor ===
The majority of Kamppi, particularly its western and northern parts, belonged to the outskirts of the city for a long time, which attracted the working population of the growing city, causing the area to form into a residential area for the poor in the middle of the 19th century. Kamppi and the Punavuori district located further south (colloquially called "Rööperi" after its Swedish name Rödbergen) were the oldest working-class district of Helsinki. Only in the 1870s with the advent of industrialisation did the working population spread north of the Pitkäsilta bridge to the areas of Kallio and Sörnäinen. The western part of Kamppi had mostly wooden houses way into the 20th century. Even today there is one block of wooden working-class houses on the street Lastenkodinkatu, colloquially called "hundred-markka villas". There are also three preserved wooden houses from the 1830s and 1840s on the street Kalevankatu, which hosted a school museum from 2000 to 2010.

The streets Lastenkodinkatu ("Children's home street") and Lastenkodinkuja ("Children's home alley") were named in 1887 after the children's home located at the site, founded in the 1860s by the women's organisation in Helsinki.

The garbage collectors' square, called Narinkka, was born near the garrison on the street Simonkatu in the 1870s. Mostly Jewish merchants sold new and used clothes and other articles at the square. The Narinkka square was closed down in 1929. The square currently located in front of the Kamppi Center shopping centre was named Narinkkatori in 2005 in honour of the history of the area.

=== War and renovation ===
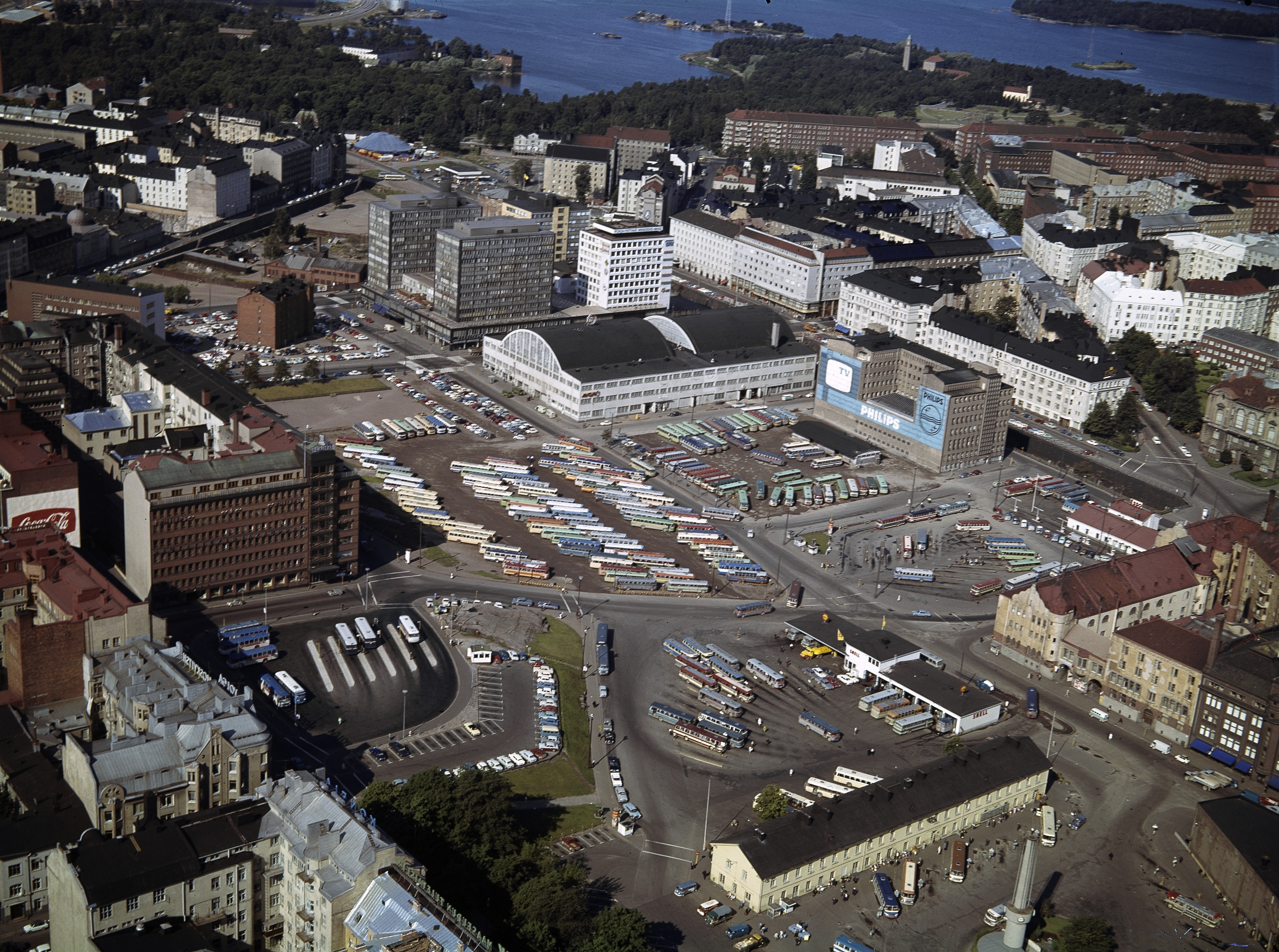
An aerial photograph of the Kamppi bus station in 1964

The Turku barracks was almost completely destroyed during the battle of Helsinki in the Finnish Civil War. Only the economic building of the barracks remained intact, and was renovated into Helsinki's main bus station in 1935. The Lasipalatsi building was built in place of the former main building of the barracks in 1936. This combination of a bus station and a bazar was part of deputy mayor Erik von Frenckell's attempt to make the city worthy of the Olympics. The Lasipalatsi building was intended as temporary, but the citizens fell in love with the building and so it could stay. The building was renovated in 1998. Most of the former garrison area, from right behind the Lasipatasi building up to the street Fredrikinkatu, served as the platform area for the bus station for decades, with departure platforms both for long-distance traffic and local traffic to the west.

The barracks buildings located on Fredrikinkatu have also all been dismantled. The Tennispalatsi building was built in the area in 1938. In the next year it was named "Auto- ja Tennistalo". The name "Tennispalatsi" originally referred only to the sports premises on the third floor of the building. At the 1952 Summer Olympics in Helsinki the halls served as competition and practice grounds for basketball. The building, designed by Helge Lundström, was designated for dismantling in 1971. However, the common opinion changed and the building could stay. Tennispalatsi was renovated in 1999 and contains the Culture Museum, exhibition spaces for the Helsinki City Art Museum, a gaming arcade, a Hesburger restaurant and Finnkino's largest cinema complex in Finland with 14 auditoriums.

The modernistic Autotalo building was inaugurated in early 1958. The Sähkötalo building designed by Alvar Aalto was completed in 1973.

The first small shops opened on 17 May 1985 in the Graniittitalo building, which was originally intended to become a department store. Construction of the building designed by Heikki and Kaija Siren started in spring 1982. There was an Anttila department store in the building from 1988 to 2016.

The street Kampinkatu was renamed Urho Kekkosen katu in early September 1980 as Helsinki's birthday gift to President of Finland Urho Kekkonen who turned 80 years old. Kekkonen had lived on the street Kampinkatu from the 1930s almost until he became president in 1956.

=== Today ===
The Helsinki Metro reached Kamppi in 1983. In the 1990s, many buildings located in Kamppi were renovated and taken back to use, including the Lasipalatsi building (1937) which is today full of restaurants and cafés and the Tennispalatsi building (1952) transformed from a sports hall to a cinema.

The reputable Ressu Upper Secondary School with an English-language International Baccalaureate line in addition to Finnish-language teaching, as well as the Helsinki Old Church and its adjacent park are located in the district of Kamppi. There are also two hotels in Kamppi area: Hotel Marski and Hotel Torni.

In July 2002 the Kamppi car bomb exploded in Kamppi. The act proved to be a contract killing, causing three men to be sentenced to life imprisonment.

The central bus station of Helsinki is located in a modern terminal built entirely underground in Kamppi, and the Helsinki railway station is located only a few hundred metres away. A popular destination in Kamppi is Tennispalatsi, the largest cinema multiplex in Helsinki.

Since August 2002, the centre of Kamppi was occupied by the largest single construction site in the history of Finland. The first phase of the project, the underground bus terminal, was opened to the public in June 2005. Completed in March 2006, the Kamppi Center also houses high-quality apartments and a large shopping mall. In 2012 the Kamppi Chapel was opened on the other end of Narinkka Square.

A railway station has been planned for Kamppi as part of the Helsinki City Rail Loop.

== Gallery ==
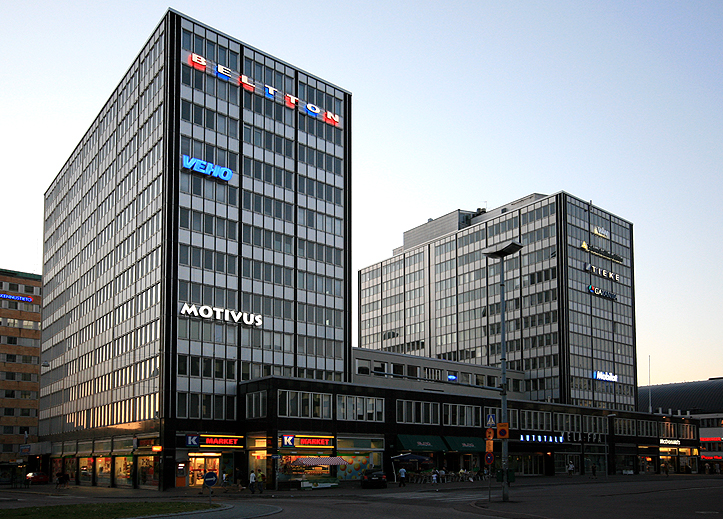
Autotalo

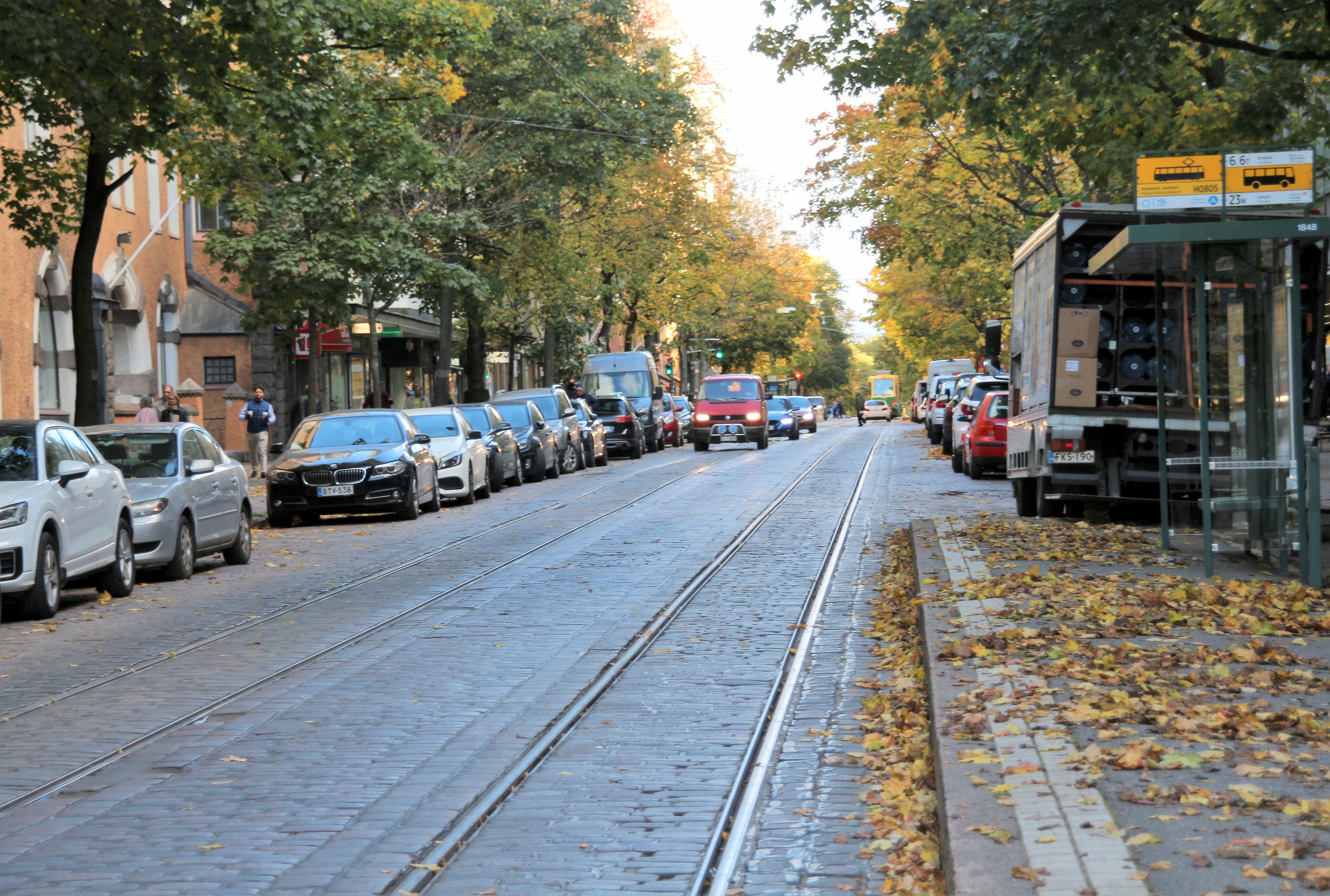
Bulevardi

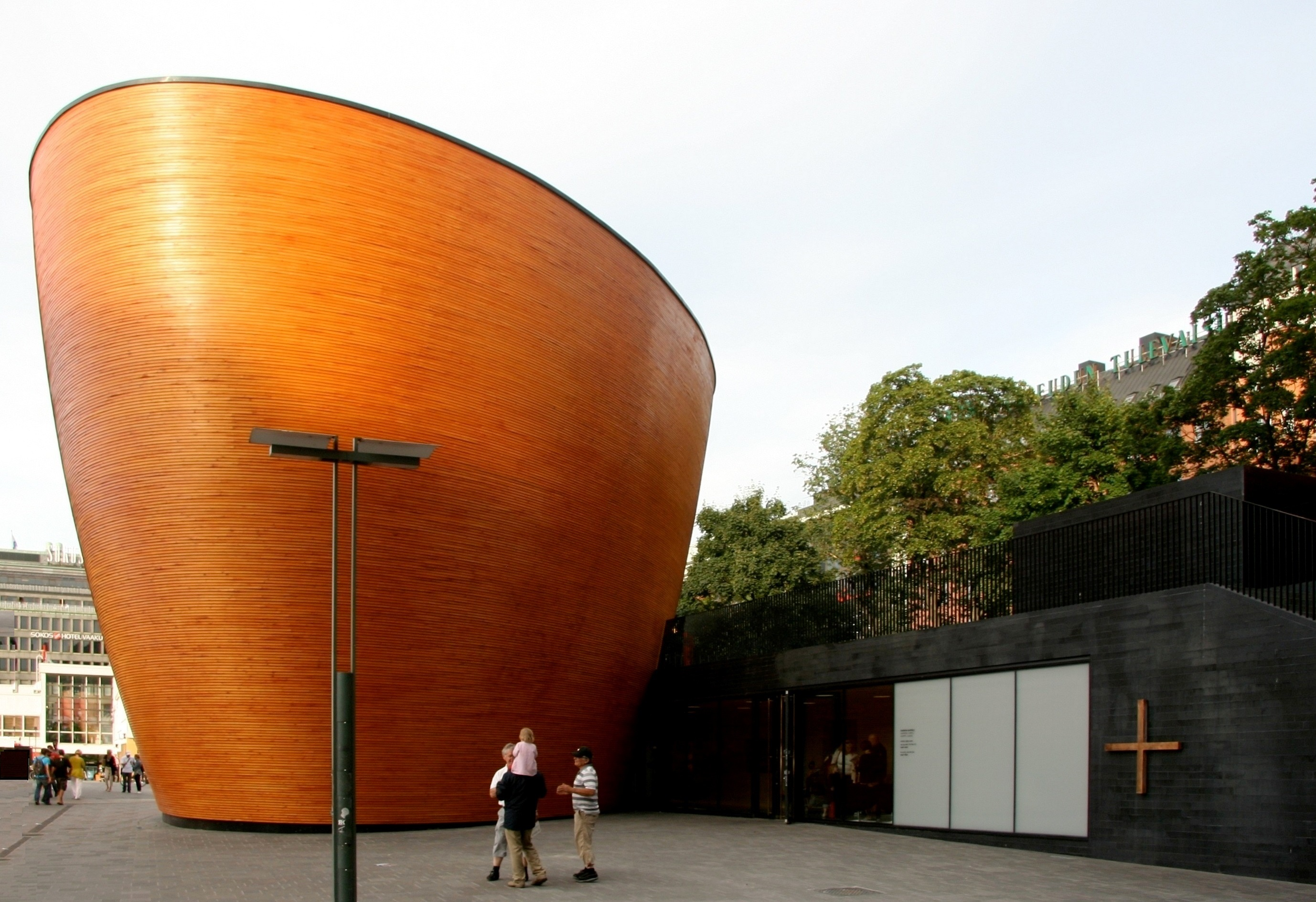
Kamppi Chapel

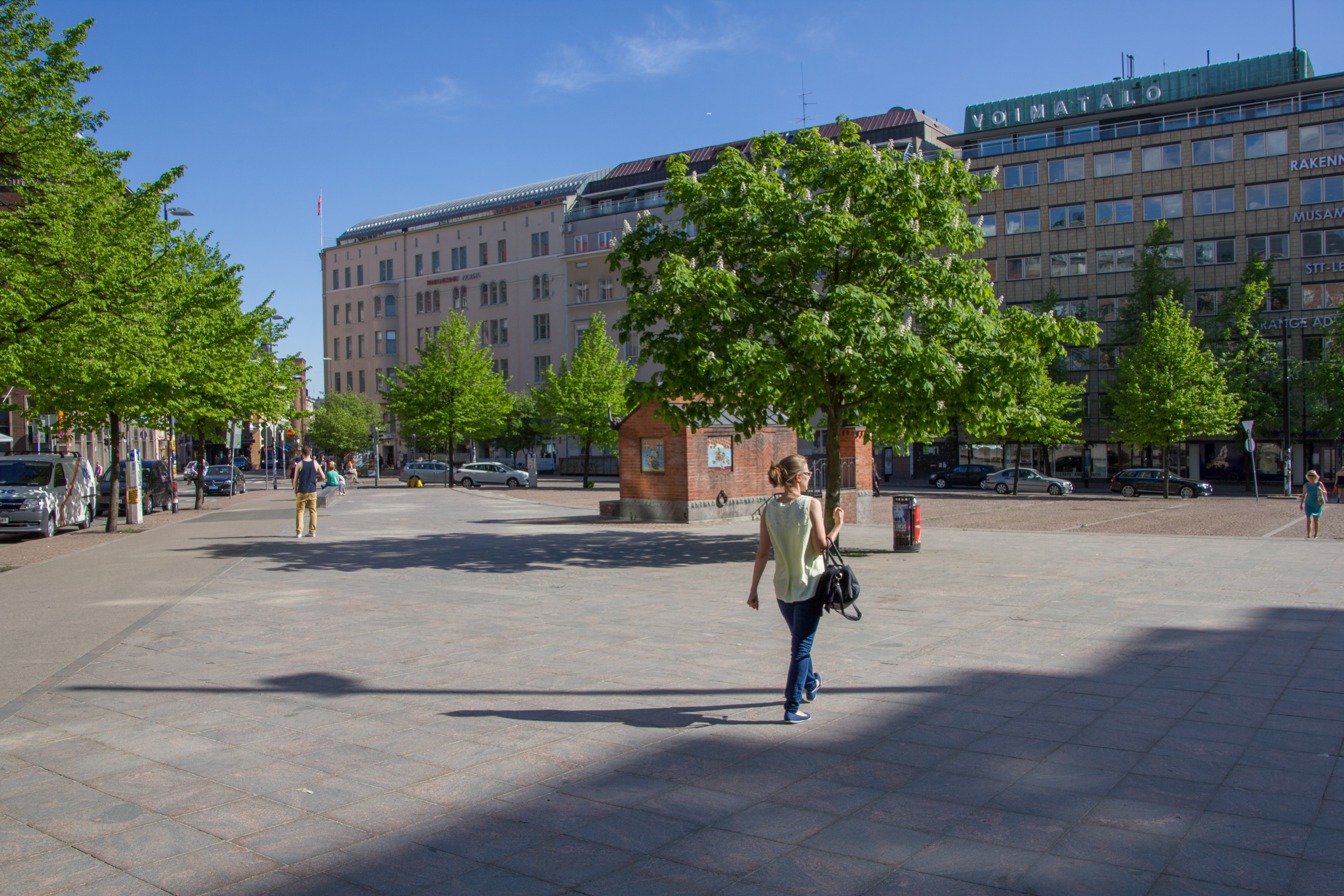
Kampintori

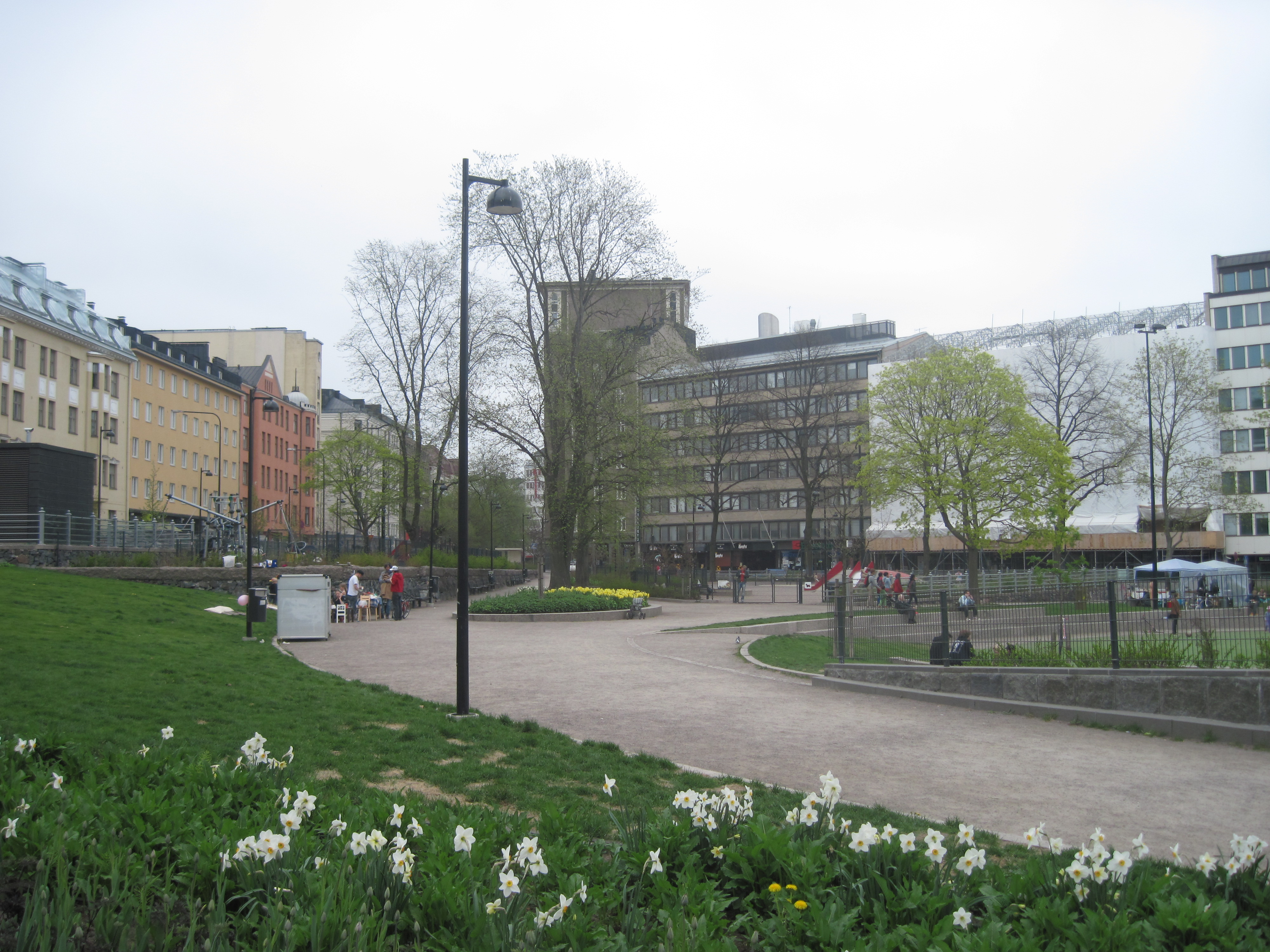
Lastenlehto

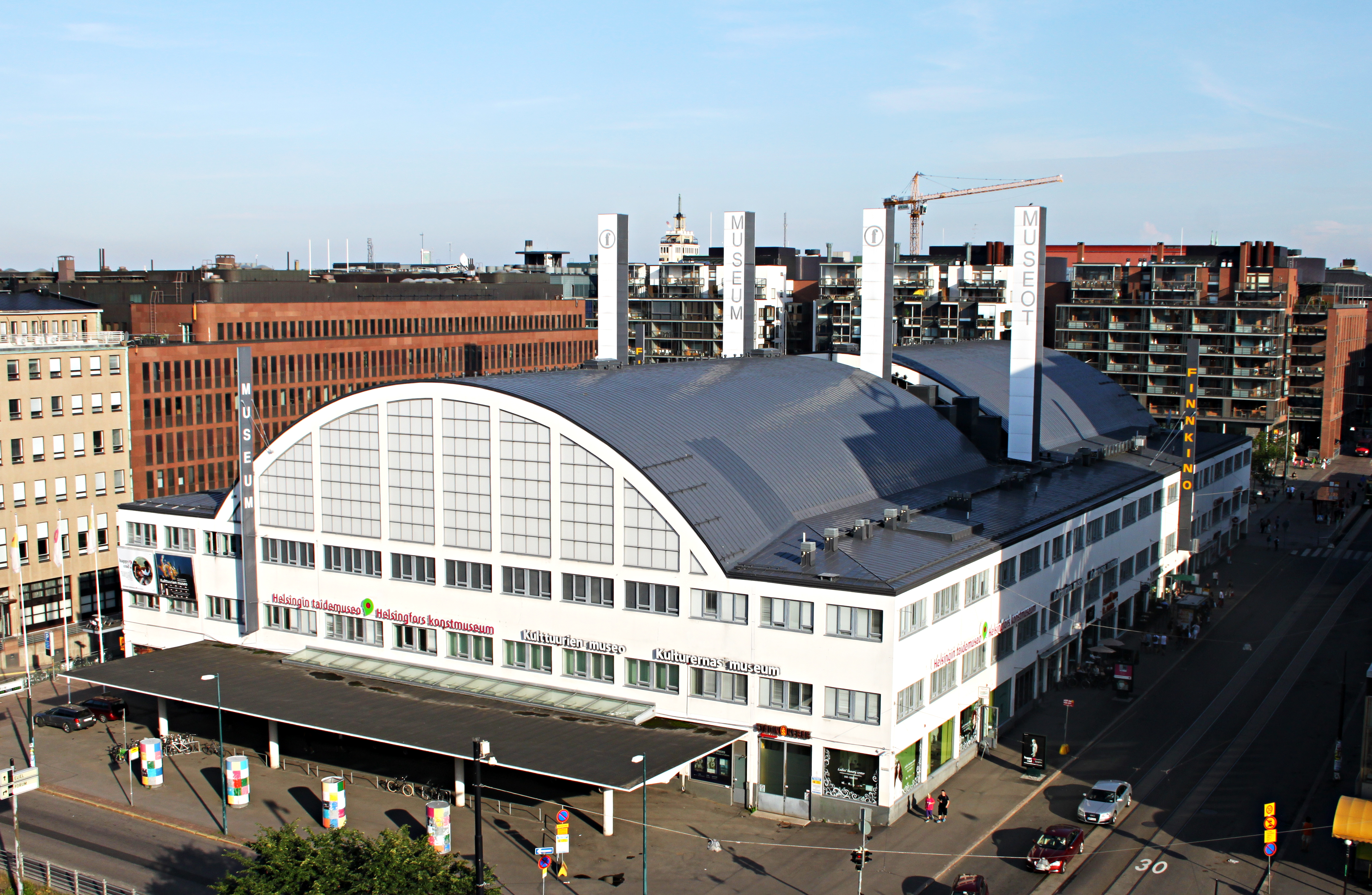
Tennispalatsi

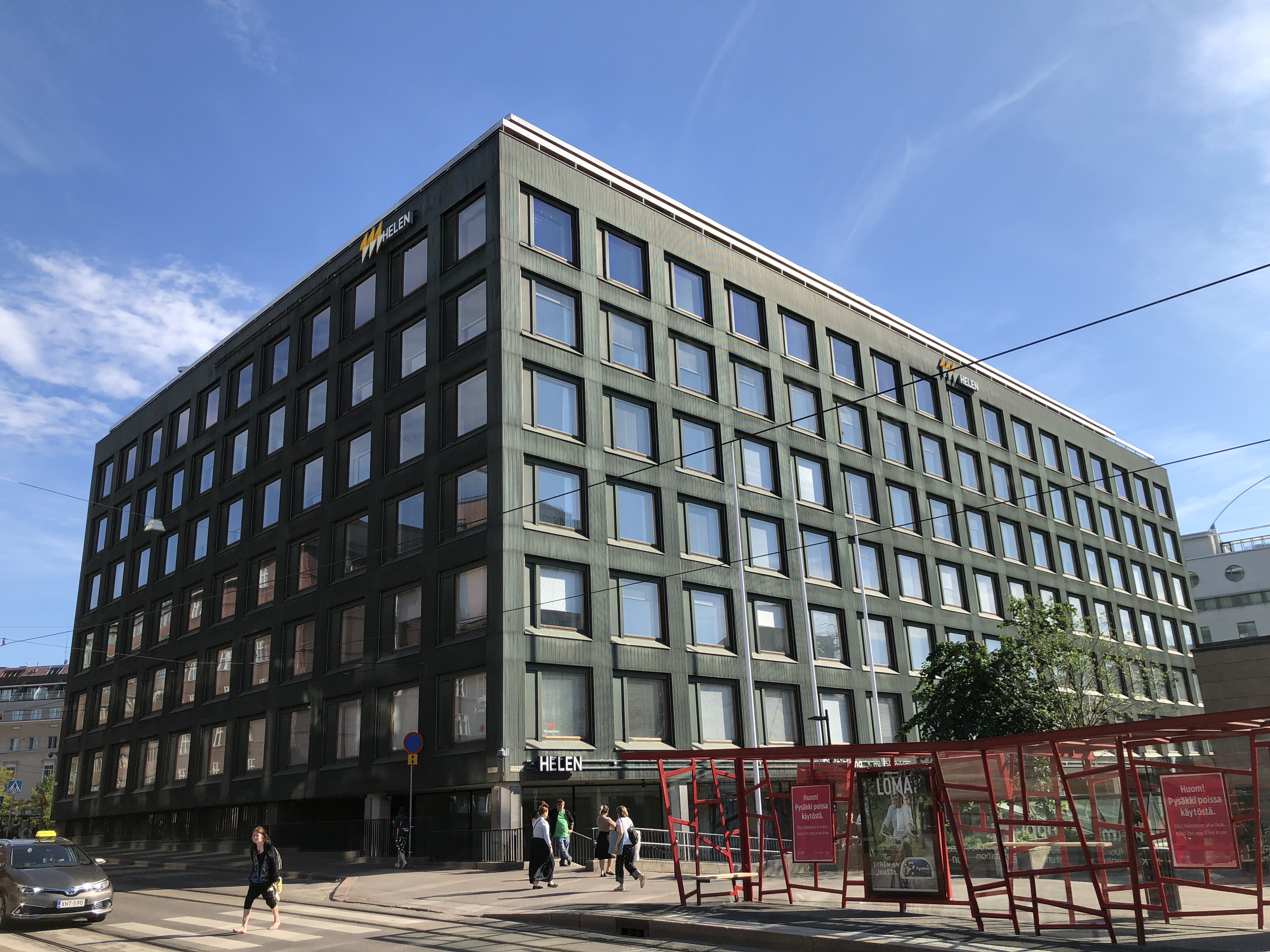
Sähkötalo

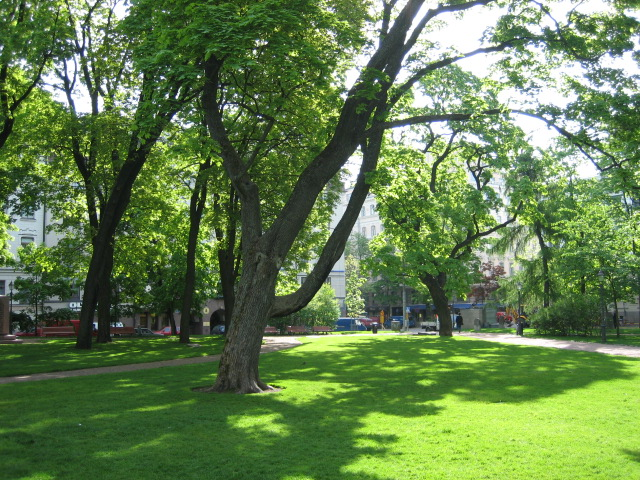
Old Church Park

== See also ==
- Bulevardi
- Kluuvi
- Punavuori
