= Heikintori =

Shopping centre in Finland

Coordinates: 60.176°N 24.802°E

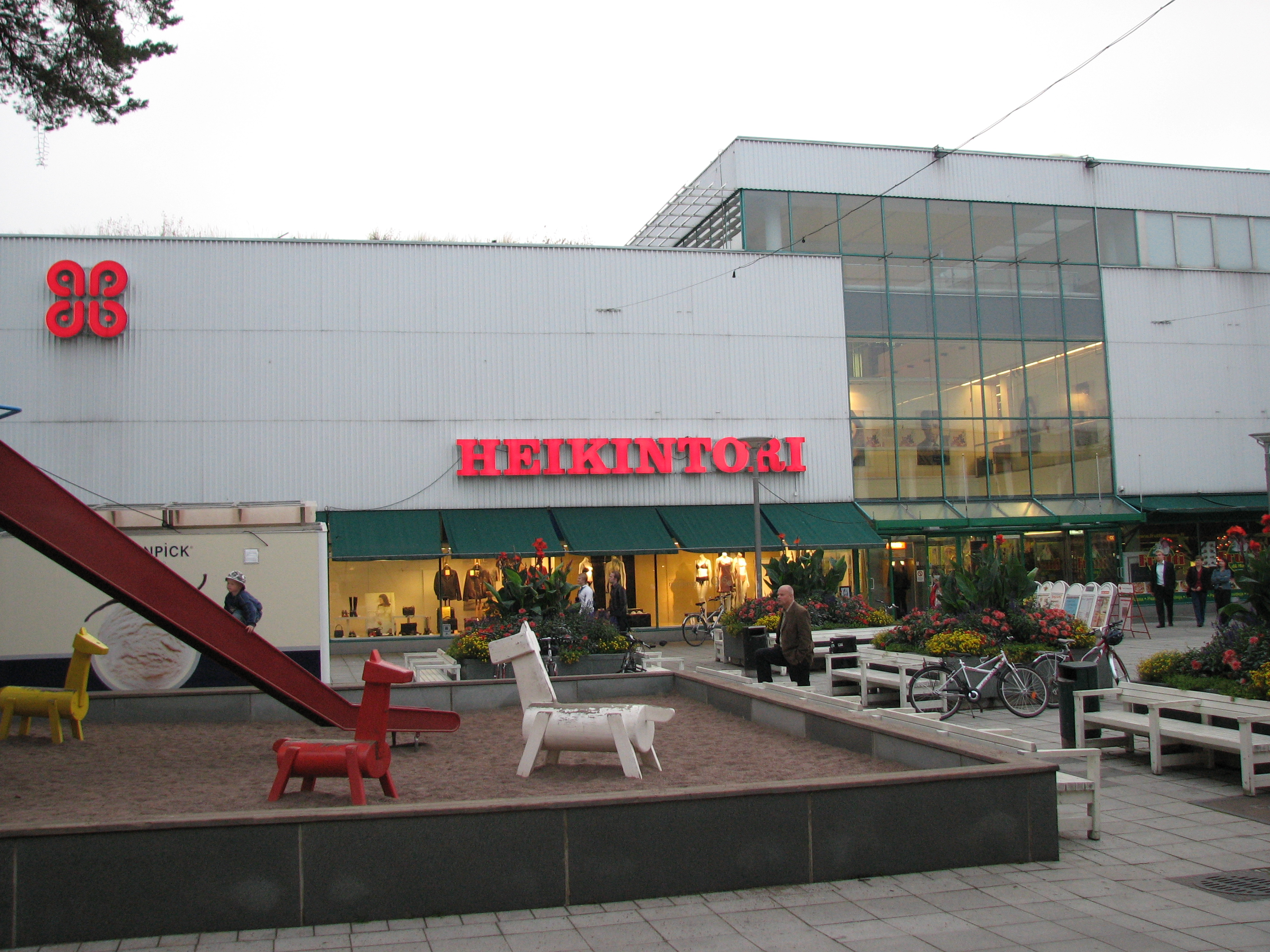
- Location: Tapiola, Espoo, Finland
- Opened: 1968
- Closed: March 2026
- Architect: Aarne Ervi
- Num. of stores: 46 (originally)
- Floors: 2

Heikintori was a shopping centre in Tapiola, Espoo, Finland. It was owned by Citycon and 27 other owners.

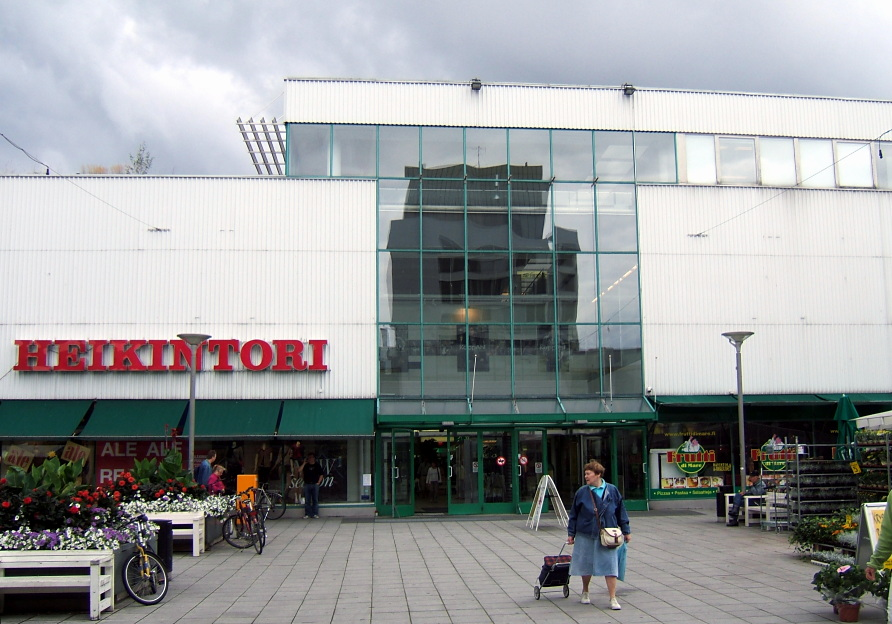
The main entrance to Heikintori

Heikintori was the second oldest shopping centre in the entire country of Finland and one of the nationally significant constructed cultural environments in Finland. It had a range of shops including, clothes and electronics stores, many restaurants, and a barber's shop. The total amount of rentable business space was 6,200 square metres.

There are about 187,000 inhabitants in Heikintori's sphere of influence. The number of households is about 81,000. The annual consumption power of the area is almost 3.1 billion euro (2006).

Shopping centres in Finland are relatively young. According to the definition used by the union of shopping centres in Finland, the oldest shopping centre in Finland was Heikintori located at the pedestrian area of Tapiola, Espoo, designed by architect Aarne Ervi and project architect Pertti Solla, opened as a department store in October 1968.

== History ==
=== Planning of Heikintori and its surroundings ===
In 1954 a design contest was held for the centre of Tapiola, which was won by architect Aarne Ervi. First, a new central pool was built in the place of a gravel pit in 1962, after which the Tapiola Church and the Tapiola school were built along its shores, as well as the Tapiola swimming pool (1965), Heikintori (1968) and the Tapiola Garden Hotel (1974), all designed by Aarne Ervi. The symbol of the centre of Tapiola, the 13-floor Tapiola central tower built in 1961, was also designed by Ervi. Some of Ervi's designs included a residential building on top of the shopping centre. Heikintori, as well as other older buildings in the area, is part of the list of nationally significant cultural environments of the Finnish Heritage Agency.

Heikintori was part of the designs of Heikki von Hertzen, the CEO of the Finnish Residential Foundation. He wanted to make Tapiola into a commercial centre similar to Helsinki, which would offer diverse and professional services. The shopping centre was designed to be a spacious and communal meeting place and as such, the business spaces were separated with glass walls. The inner ceiling of the building was painted yellow. The corridor on the ground floor of Heikintori was a continuation of the pedestrian street Tapionraitti and it was nicknamed "The shopping street of the eternal summer".

=== Opening of Heikintori (1968) ===
Heikintori was opened in October 1968. The shopping centre had food automats open 24 hours a day. Businesses in the shopping centre included grocery stores, a restaurant, a Primula café and bar, a gardening store, an electronics store, a hardware store, two banks, a cosmetics store, a florist, a Musiikki-Fazer record store, a furniture store, a pedicure shop, a hairdresser, a barber, a dress atelier, a hat fashion shop, a wig store, a photography atelier and the K-Supermarket Heikintori grocery store.

In November 1968 the first discotheque in Espoo was opened at Heikintori. The discotheque was named Downsound as a result of a naming competition and was located at the basement of Heikintori. It had a capacity of 300 customers. The discotheque was decorated with recycled material by the pop artists Howard Smith and Zoltán Popovits.

=== Heikintori (1969 to present) ===
In 2008 a dance ball was held at Heikintori to celebrate the building's 40th anniversary.

In 2015 71.3% of the business space at Heikintori had been rented.

In 2016 Citycon owned 68.7% of the business space at Heikintori. The total surface area of rentable business space was 4,500 square metres and the building's anchor tenants were Eurokangas and the Finnish post office. Business spaces were also rented to pop up businesses.

In summer 2017 Citycon and the minor owners of the building made a deal that Heikintori could be developed as a singular entity. In October 2017 Citycon announced it was planning a complete repair of Heikintori and building a four-story apartment building on top of the floor of the business building. Repairs and construction were supposed to start in late 2019. The parking garage was supposed to be demolished and a seven-story apartment building was planned in its place, which would have had 120 apartments. The ground floor was supposed to house speciality stores and restaurants while the second floor would have had services and the third floor would have had a kindergarten.

== Future ==
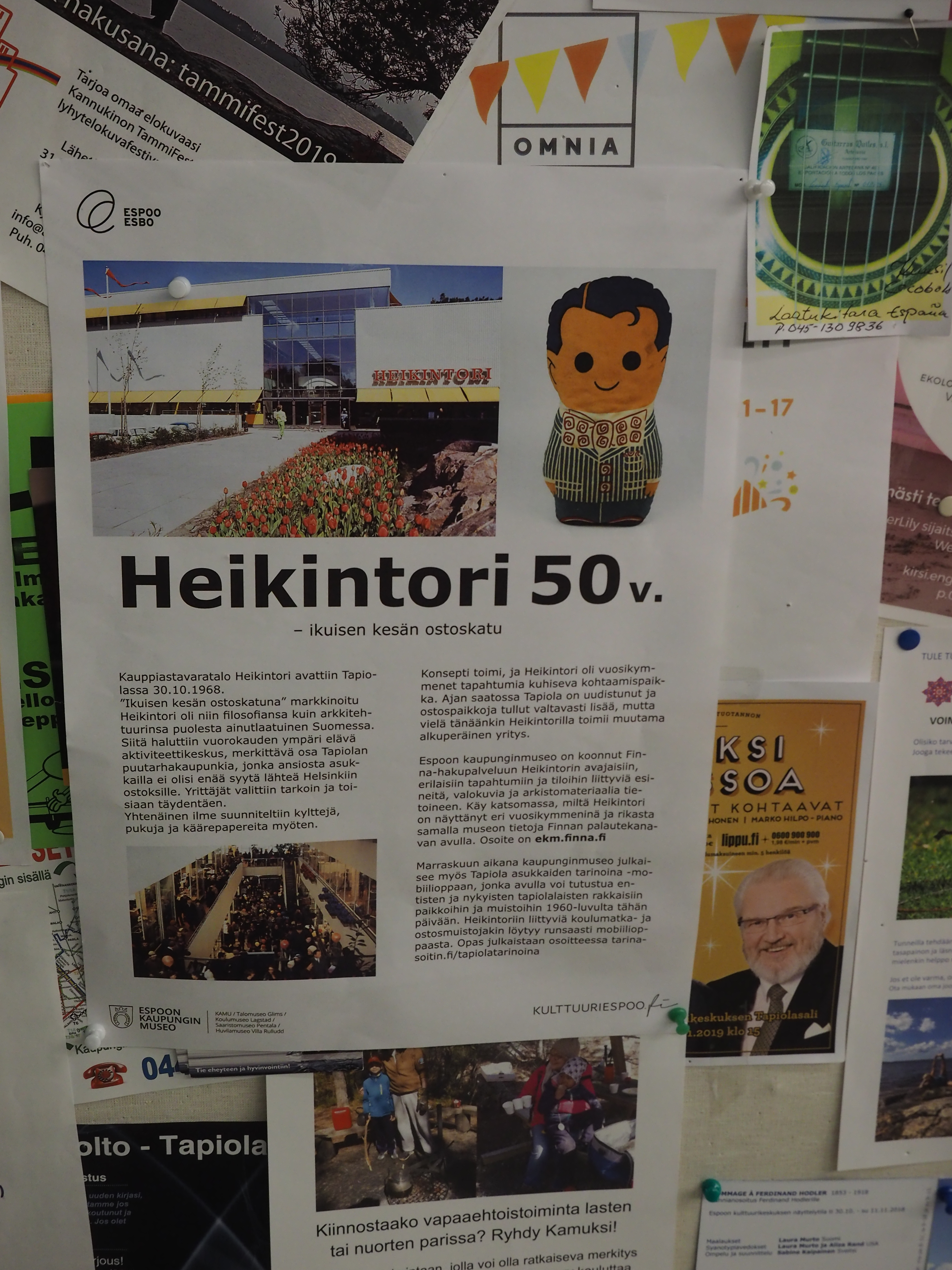
Heikintori turned 50 years old on 30 October 2018 but had already deteriorated so much that no event was held to celebrate it.

Heikintori has long been in need of renovation. A part of Heikintori belongs to the environment designed by Aarne Ervi, which falls under protection.

In 2018 there were so few tenants left at Heikintori (a little over 20) that no celebration was held for its 50th anniversary. In 2020, Heikintori only had a few stores left, including two restaurants, a bar, a barber's shop and a flea market. The only surviving original store is restaurant Ribis. Citycon reported that it had been negotiating with the 27 other owners of Heikintori about the long-time strategy for the shopping centre, but no schedule or plans about the renovation were published. The building is partly protected, which causes difficulties for the renovation.

Heikintori under repairs in August 2026

By the end of March 2026, the leases of all remaining tenants at Heikintori had ended ahead of a major renovation. The primary proposal for the building's future use is to convert it entirely into social welfare and health care facilities.
