= Architects NRT =

Finnish architecture firm

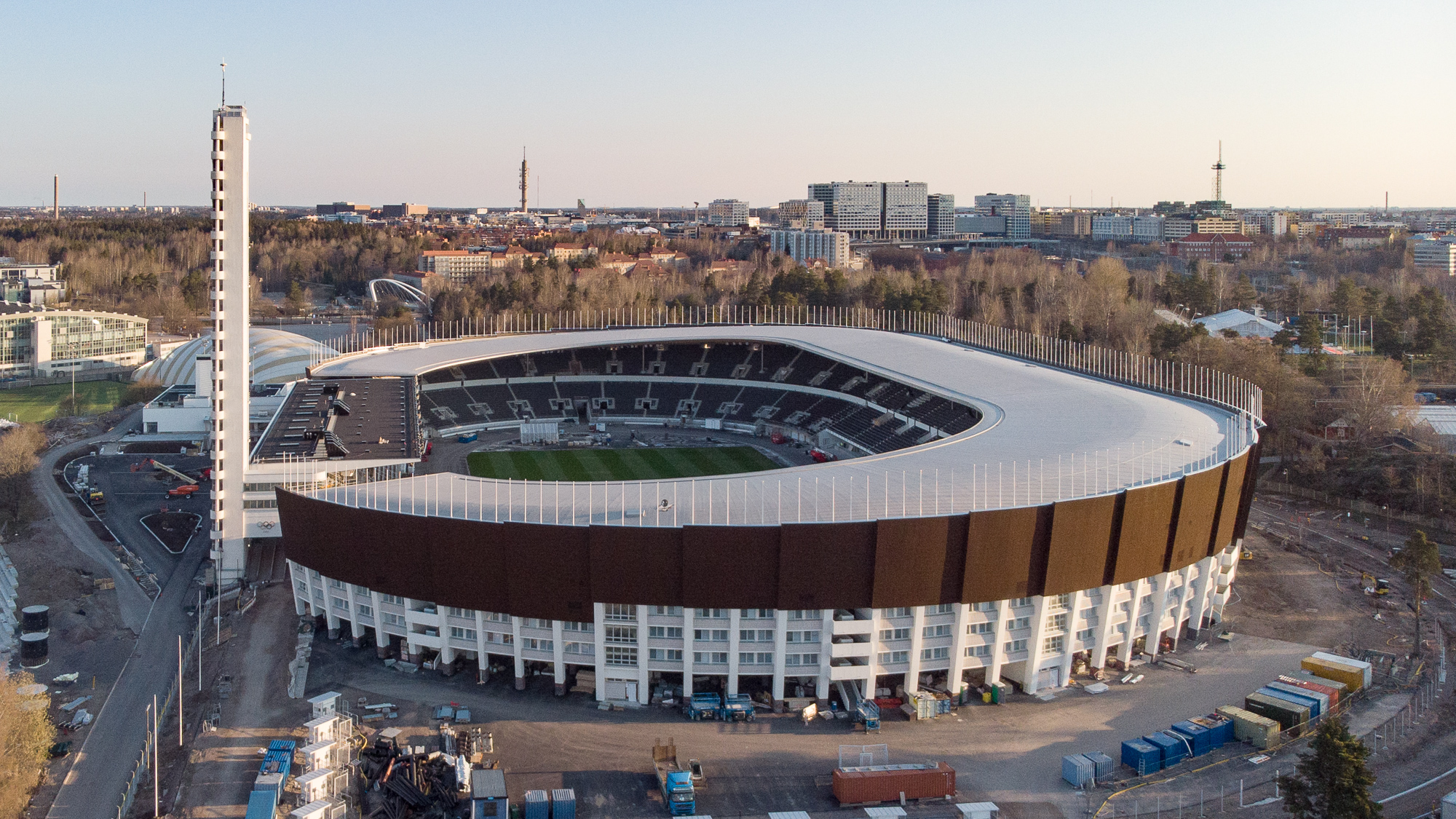
- Helsinki Olympic Stadium in 2020, renovated by NRT Architects

Practice information
- Partners: Kari Raimoranta, Jyrki Tasa, Teemu Tuomi
- Founded: 1979/2006
- Location: Helsinki, Finland

Significant works and honors
- Projects: Renovation of Helsinki Olympic Stadium and Finlandia Hall
- Awards: Finlandia Prize (2017, 2020)

Website
- www.arkkitehditnrt.fi/en

Architects NRT (Finnish: Arkkitehdit NRT, formerly Arkkitehtitoimisto Nurmela, Raimoranta, Tasa Oy) is a Finnish architectural firm specialising in renovations, educational buildings and housing. It is known, historically, for its pioneering role in Finnish postmodern architecture. Recently, it was recognized for the conversion of the Aalto University Main Library into the Harald Herlin Learning Centre (2017), in collaboration with JKMM Architects, and the conversion and extension of the Helsinki Olympic Stadium (2020) with K2S Architects, both of which won the Finlandia Prize for Architecture.

== History ==
NRT's predecessor, Katras, was founded in 1971. Its founding members included architects Pekka Helin and Tuomo Siitonen, as well as Matti Nurmela (1946–2012), Kari Raimoranta (born 1945) and Jyrki Tasa (born 1944). The latter three split from Katras and founded their own practice in 1979. The firm operated as a general partnership (avoin yhtiö) until becoming a joint stock company (osakeyhtiö) in 1993. The office was called Arkkitehtitoimisto Nurmela, Raimoranta, Tasa Oy until 2006, when it was abbreviated to NRT based on the founders’ initials.

In the 1980s, NRT founders were recognised as representatives of postmodern architecture in Finland. Notable works from this era include the Malmi postal building (Malmin postitalo, 1986), Kuhmo City Library (1988), and BePOP Shopping Centre (1989). The latter is considered distinctive of Finnish postmodern architecture. In 1994, the Museum of Finnish Architecture organised a retrospective exhibition on the work of the office in the 1980s. Malcolm Quantrill saw Nurmela, Raimoranta, and Tasa's work in the early 1980s, along with the work of Helin and Siitonen, as a ″return to the Finnish sense of delicate forms and refinement of detail″ as opposed to ″[...] the general international production of bland, large-scale masses that are boringly repetitive″, and lifted up the Kuhmo City Library as an example of this development.

== Representative works ==
Architects NRT has overseen many renovation and expansion projects of historically significant buildings, for instance the main building of the Bank of Finland (2006) and the Porthania building of the University of Helsinki (2006). The firm has renovated several buildings originally designed by Alvar Aalto, such as Finlandia Hall (2024), the Kulttuuritalo cultural centre (2013), and many buildings on the Aalto University Otaniemi campus. NRT also designed the conversion and renovation of the Tennispalatsi building into film and exhibition space (1999).

Notable new public building projects in the 1980s, apart from the aforementioned Malmi postal building, Kuhmo City Library, and BePOP Shopping Centre, included the Kanta-Häme Regional Savings Bank in Hämeenlinna (1987) as well as the Paavo Nurmi Stadium in Turku (1989). Later, the firm has designed educational buildings, such as the Paja Building (Kouvola, 2010) and the Kotka campus (2024) for the South-Eastern Finland University of Applied Sciences XAMK, the latter in collaboration with AOR Architects.

Significant housing work include Stanssi & Svingi Housing in the Katajanokka district of Helsinki (2007), the waterfront Merenkulkijanranta Housing in the Lauttasaari district (2008–2015), and the Pasilan Konepaja housing area (2007–2015).

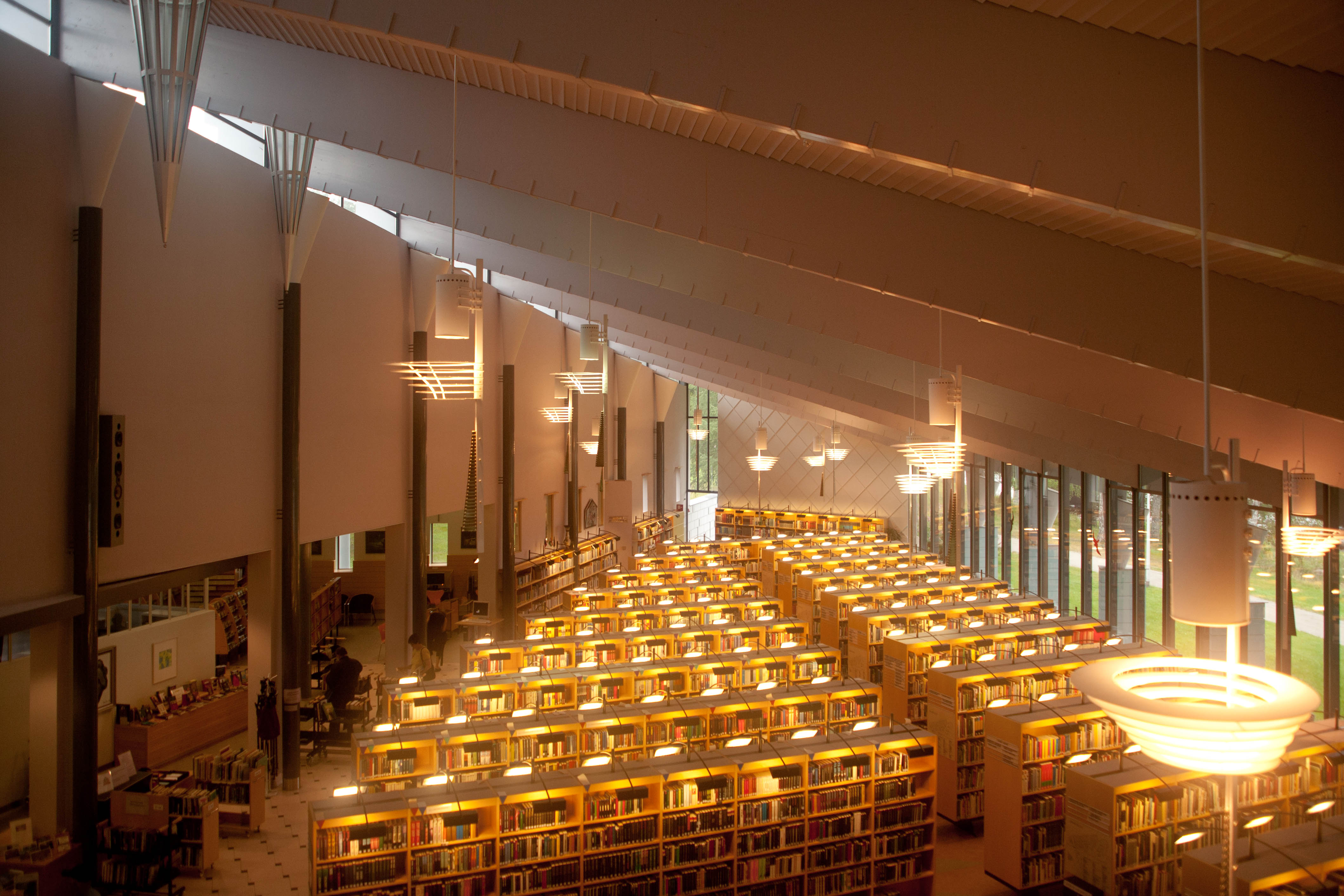
Kuhmo City Library (1988)

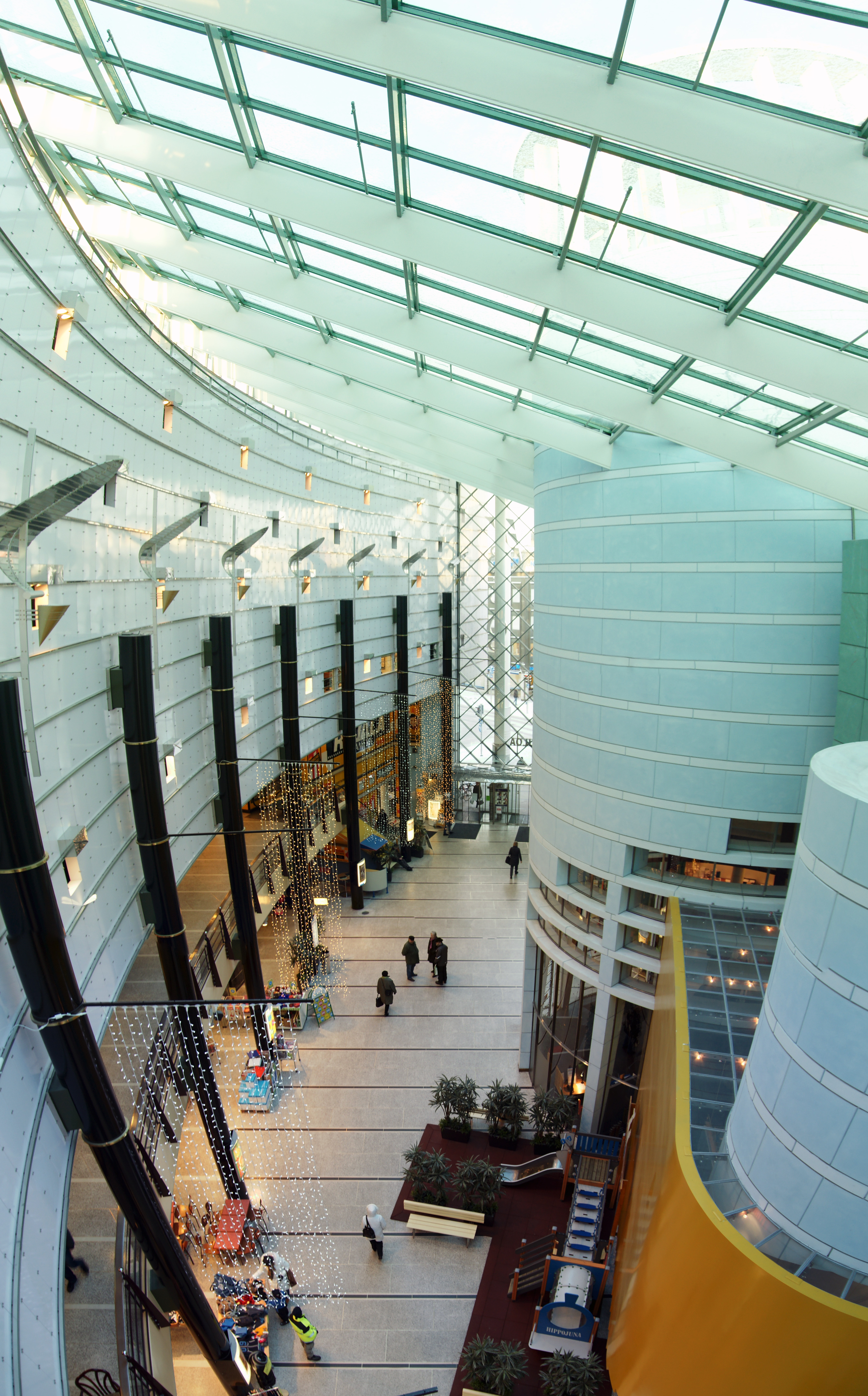
BePOP Shopping Centre (1989)

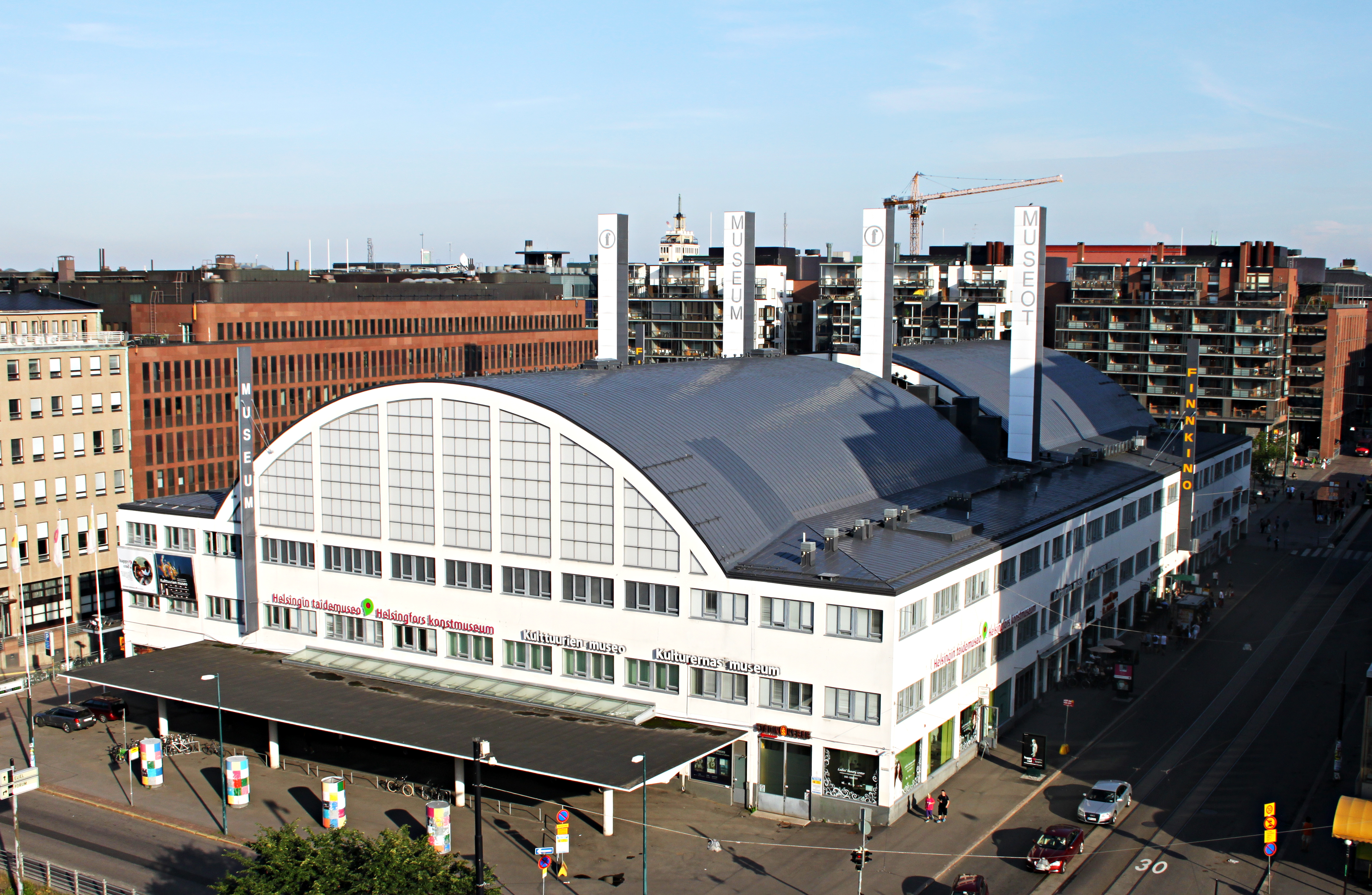
Tennispalatsi Building in 2013

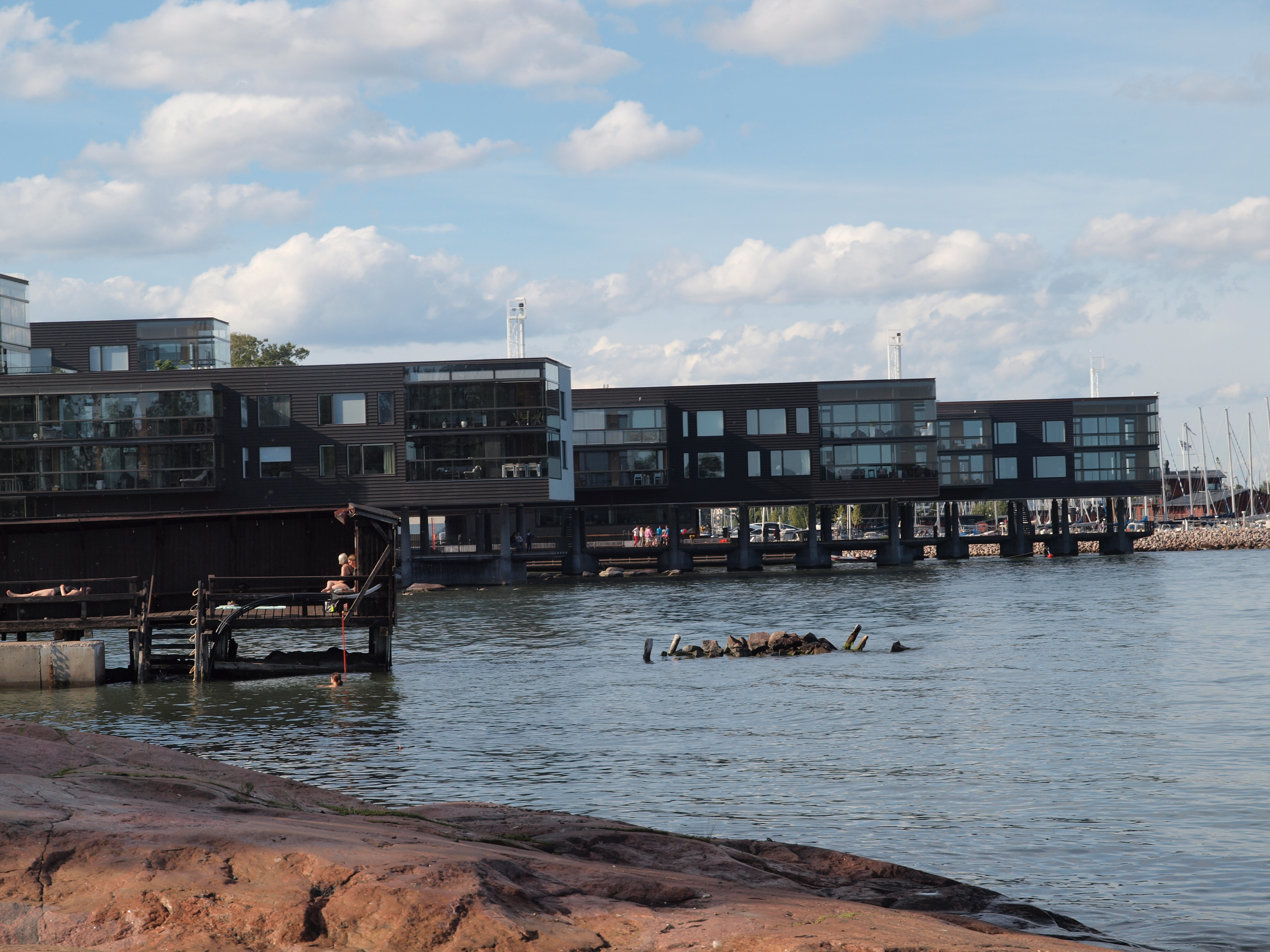
Merenkulkijanranta housing (2015)

== Awards and recognitions ==
Architects NRT has won two Finlandia prizes for Architecture: for the Harald Herlin Learning Centre in 2017, in collaboration with JKMM Architects, and for the renovation of the Helsinki Olympic Stadium in 2021, in collaboration with K2S. In 2025 the firm was shortlisted for the prize for the renovation of the Finlandia Hall, and in 2015 for the Merenkulkijanranta housing block.

Two of the firm's renovation projects have won the Europa Nostra award, the renovation of the Porthania building of the University of Helsinki in 2007 and the renovation of Tapiola swimming pool in 2008.

Architects NRT was awarded the "Rose for Building" prize (Rakentamisen Ruusu) by the Helsinki City Building Control Commission in 2006. According to the jury's justification, the firm represented "new and bold ideas both regarding architecture of the exterior and spatial solutions. [... It] has also in an extraordinary way responded to challenges involved with the planning of repairs of high-profile buildings. The unquestioned starting point for the repairs has clearly been respect for the original architecture, and an adequate inventory of the building has been carried out first.“
