= Aarne Ervi =

Finnish architect

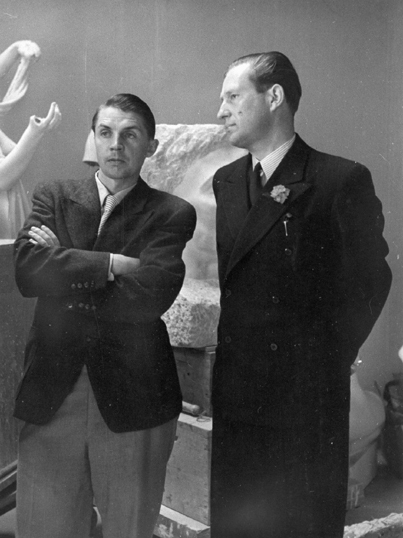
Aarne Ervi (left) with Viljo Revell in Germany in 1943

Aarne Adrian Ervi (originally Aarne Adrian Elers) (19 May 1910 – 26 September 1977) was one of the most important architects of Finland's post-World War II reconstruction period.

Ervi was born in Forssa, and graduated as an architect from the Helsinki University of Technology in 1935. After his graduation, he worked in the architect offices of Alvar Aalto and Toivo Paatela, before starting his own office in 1938.

Ervi completed his most notable and well-known works during the post-war reconstruction period and later in the 1950s during the development of Finland's modern construction industry. Ervi was among the pioneers in the use of concrete elements in Finnish architecture while working on the design of the University of Helsinki's Porthania building in 1949. He also designed hydro power plants and residential areas for the company's employees for Oulujoki Oy. One of Finland's largest hydro power plants in Pyhäkoski was designed by Ervi, as was nearly all of the nearby settlement, Leppiniemi.

Ervi is probably best known for designing the town center plan of Tapiola after winning a design contest held in 1954. He also designed many of its most recognizable buildings, including the Tapiola Central Tower, shopping centers Tapiontori and Heikintori, and the swimming hall.

Ervi was an honorary member of the American Institute of Architects and received an honorary doctorate from the University of Stuttgart. He died in Helsinki, aged 67.

== Works by Ervi ==
=== Oulujoki ===
- Pyhäkoski power plant and Leppiniemi in Muhos (1942–1951)
- Jylhämä power plant and residential area in Vaala (1946–1950)
- Nuojua power plant and residential area in Vaala (1946–1950)
- Pälli power plant and residential area in Muhos (1946–1950)
- Montta power plant in Muhos (1951)
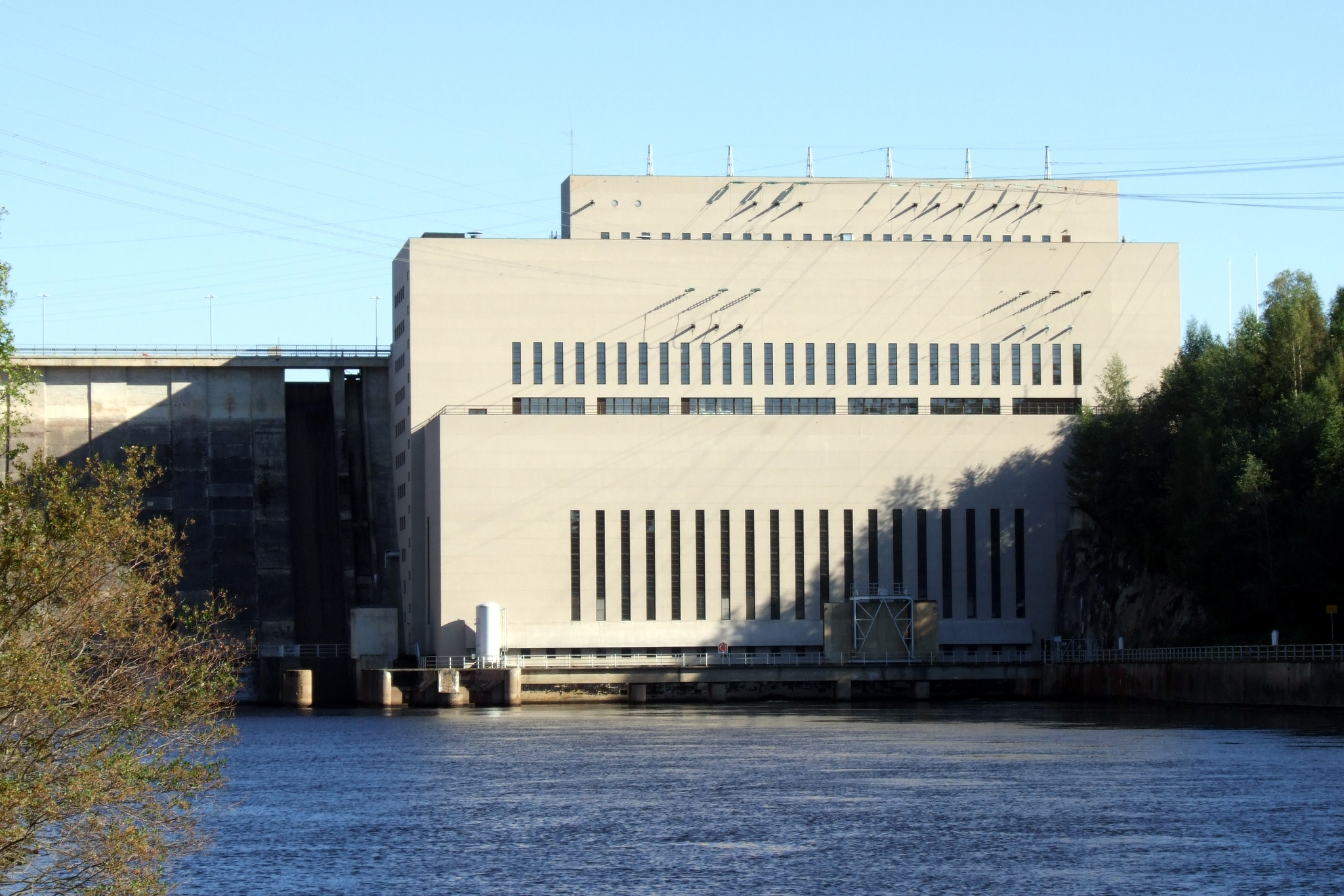
Pyhäkoski power plant

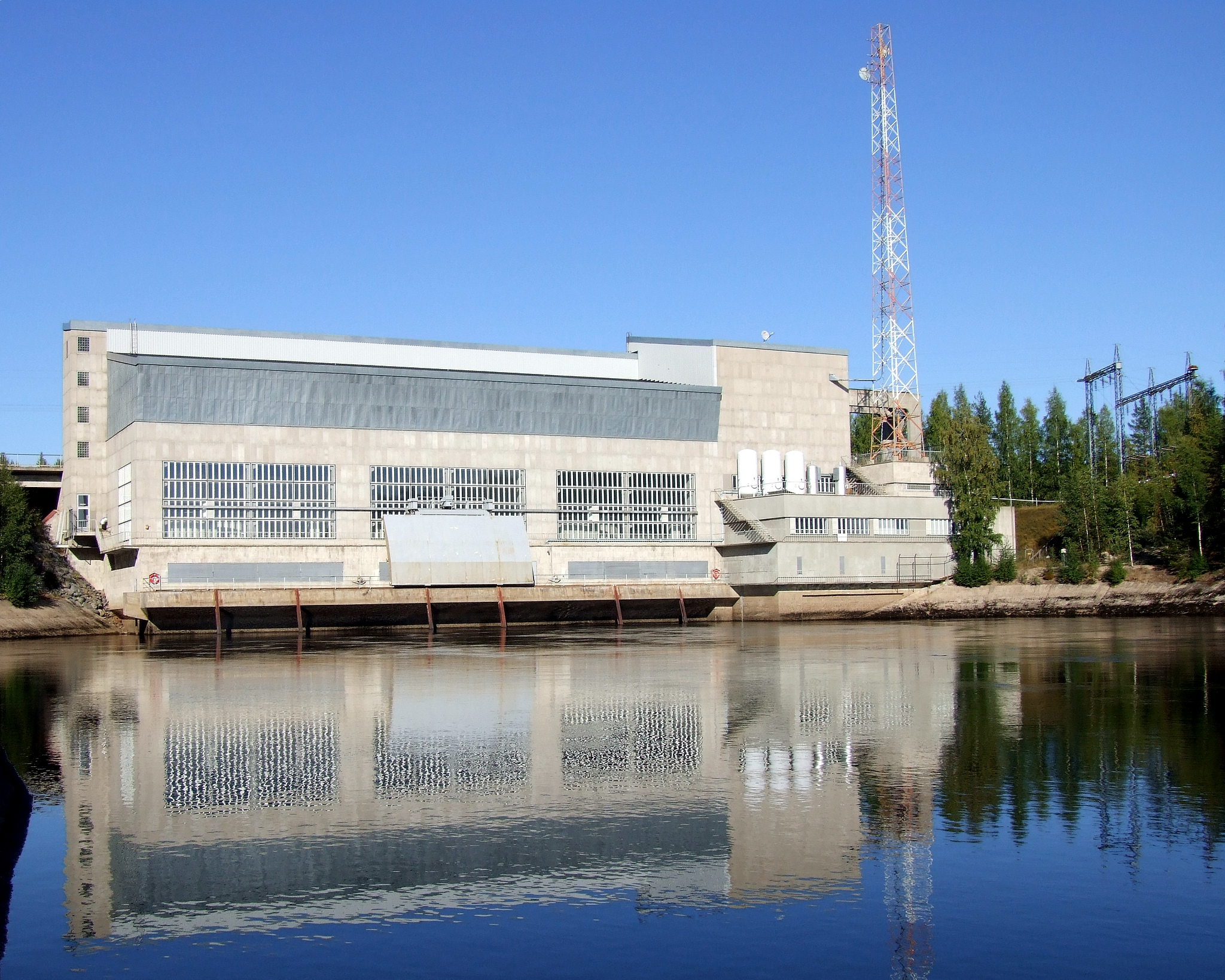
Montta power plant

=== Tapiola ===
- Plan for the town center of Tapiola (1954)
- Mäntytorni (1954)
- Kino Tapiola (1955)
- Tapiola Central Tower and Tapiontori shopping center (1959–1961)
- Swimming hall (1965–1968)
- Heikintori shopping center (1968)
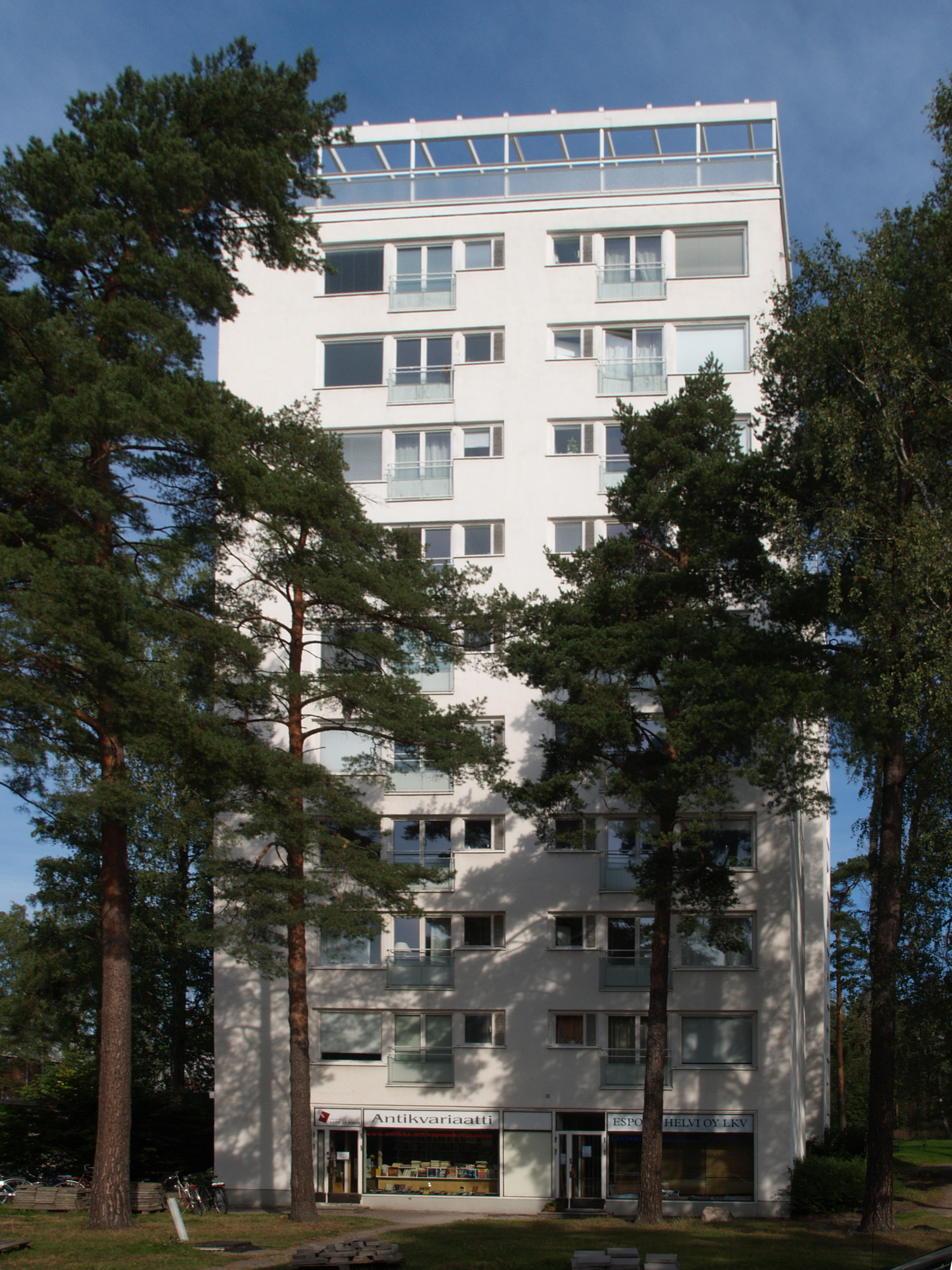
Mäntytorni apartment building in Tapiola

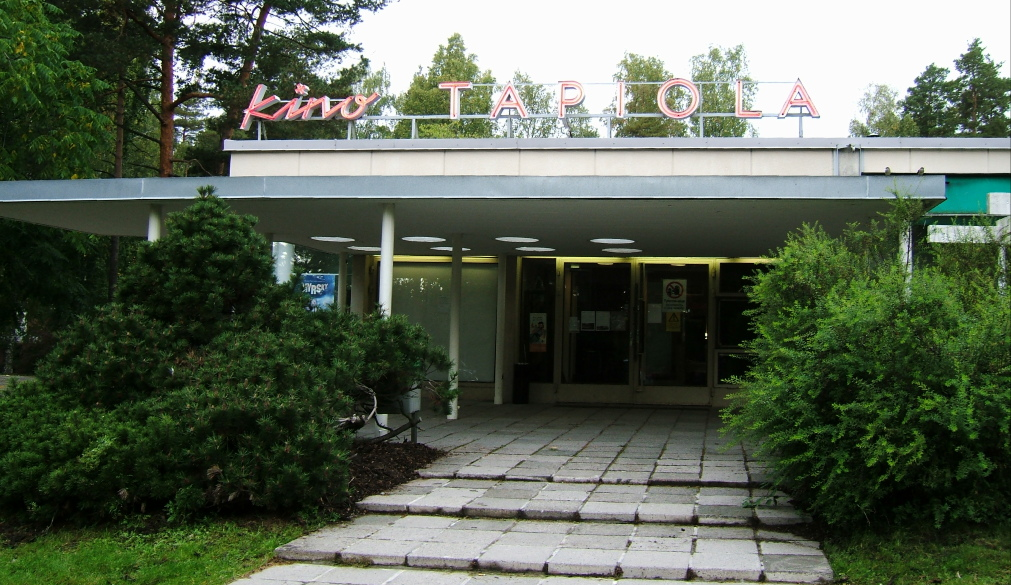
Kino Tapiola

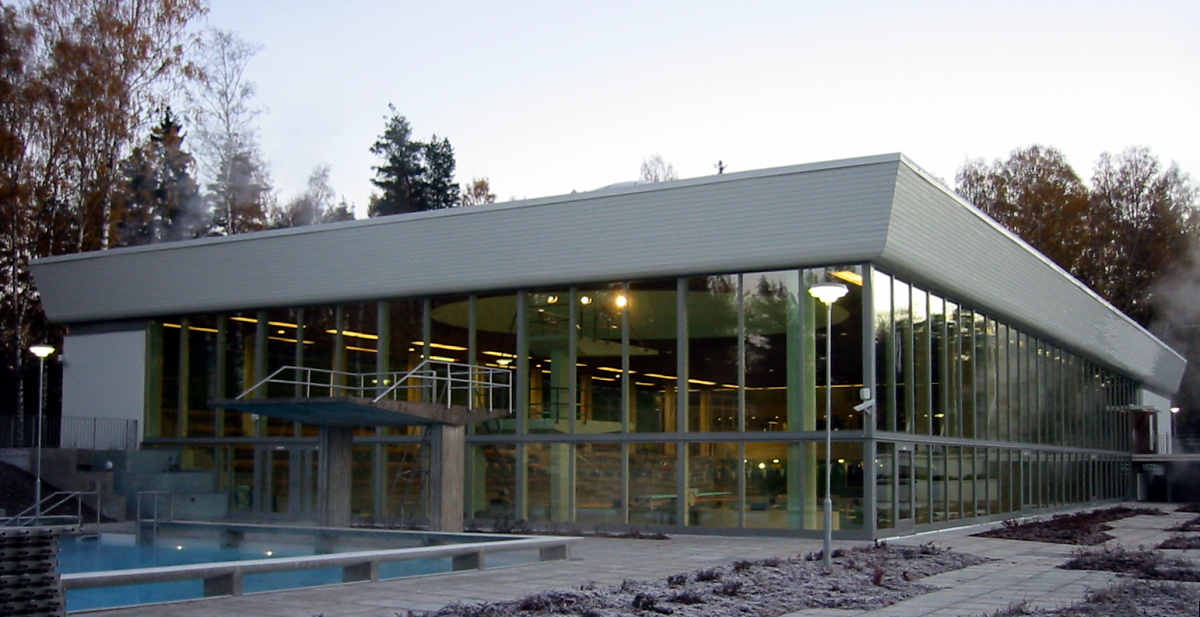
Tapiola swimming hall

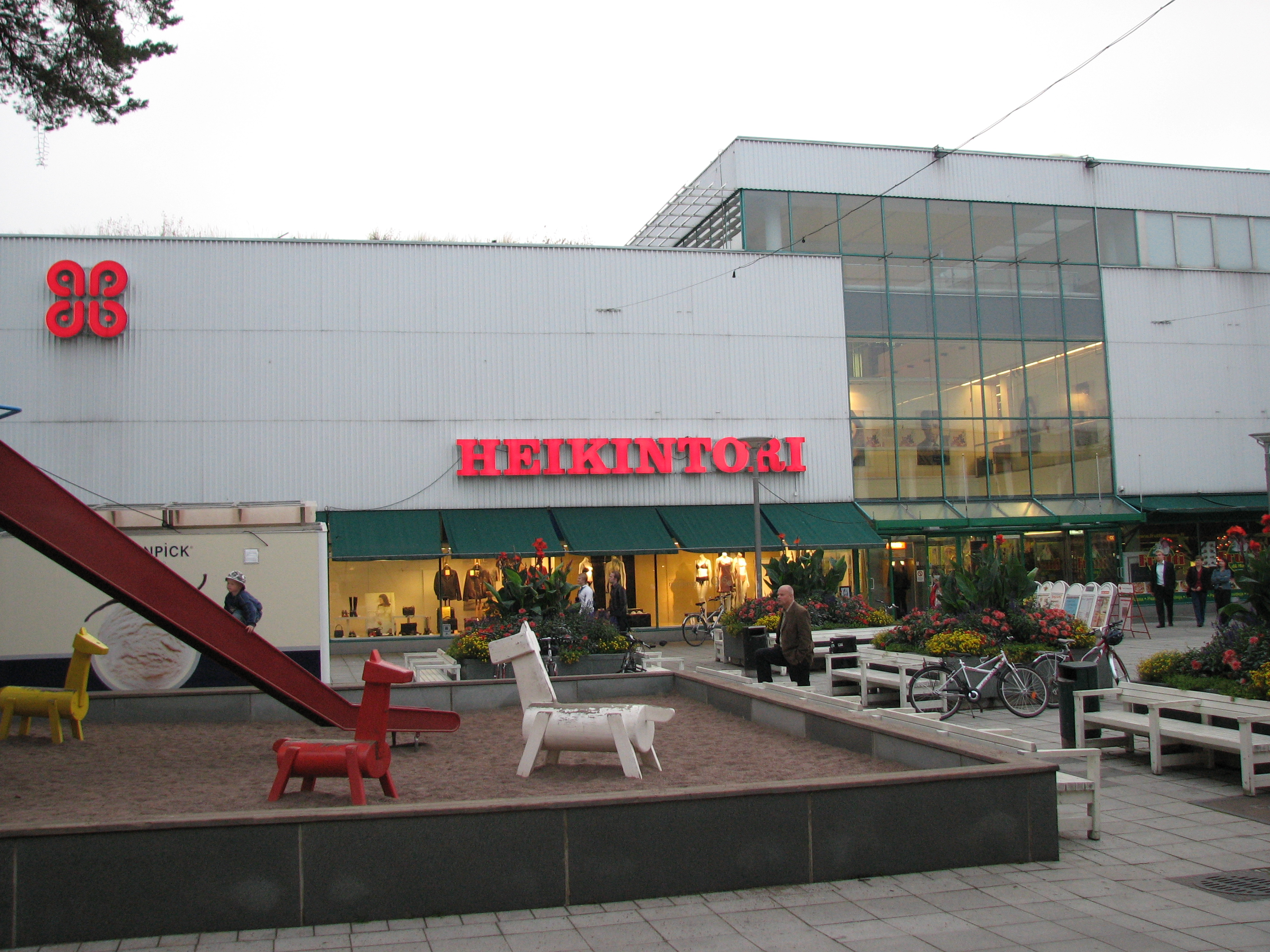
Heikintori shopping centre

=== Other works ===
- Villa Ervi (1951, 1962)
- Pieksämäki water tower (1956)
- The new campus for the University of Turku (1956–1959)
- The Porthania building for the University of Helsinki (1957)
- Culinary school Perho, Helsinki (1957)
- Messukylä Gymnasium (1961)
- The expansion of the Kemi city hall (1967)
- Töölö Library, the city library of Helsinki (1970)

== Gallery ==
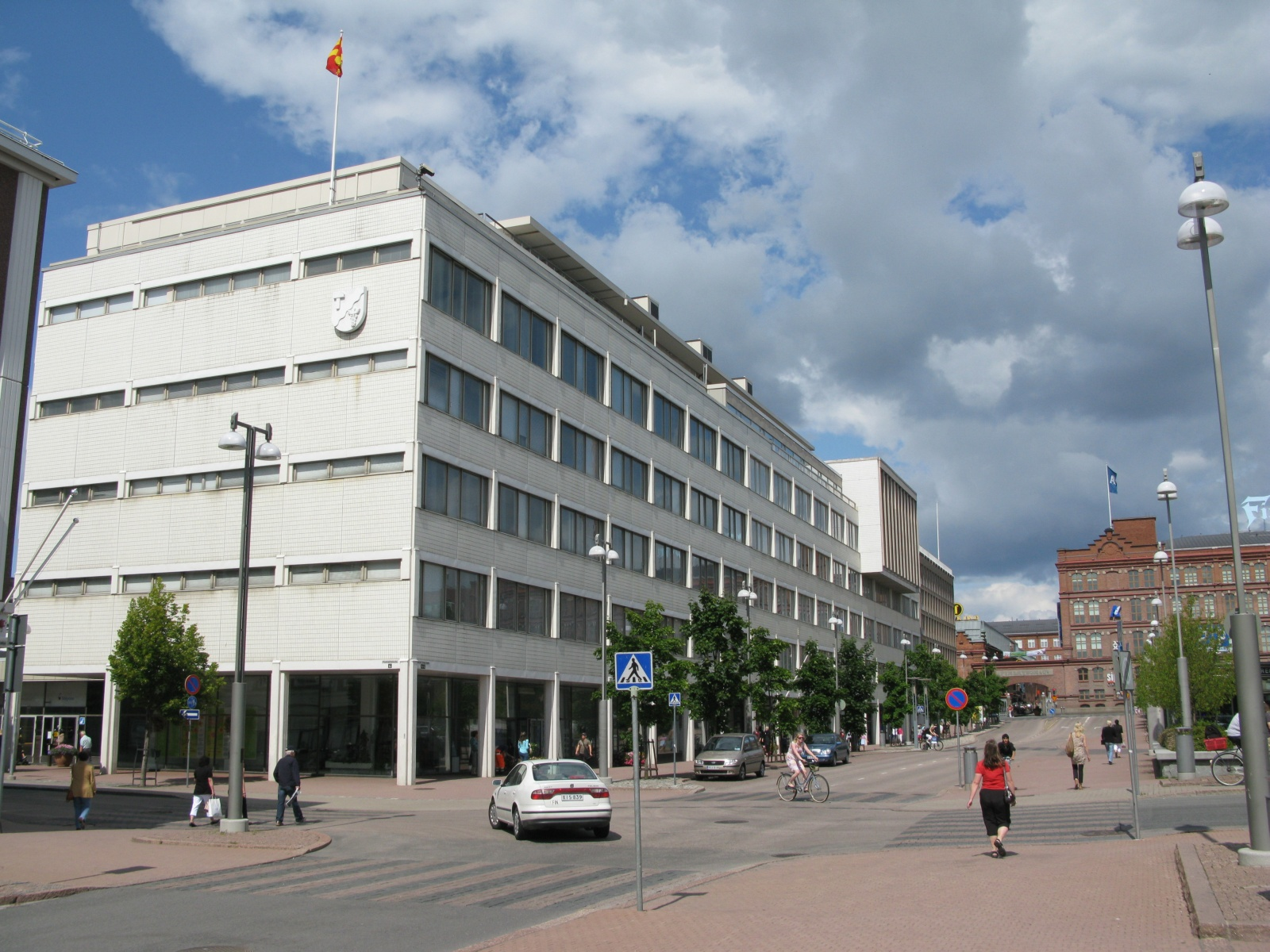
Tampere City Central Office Building

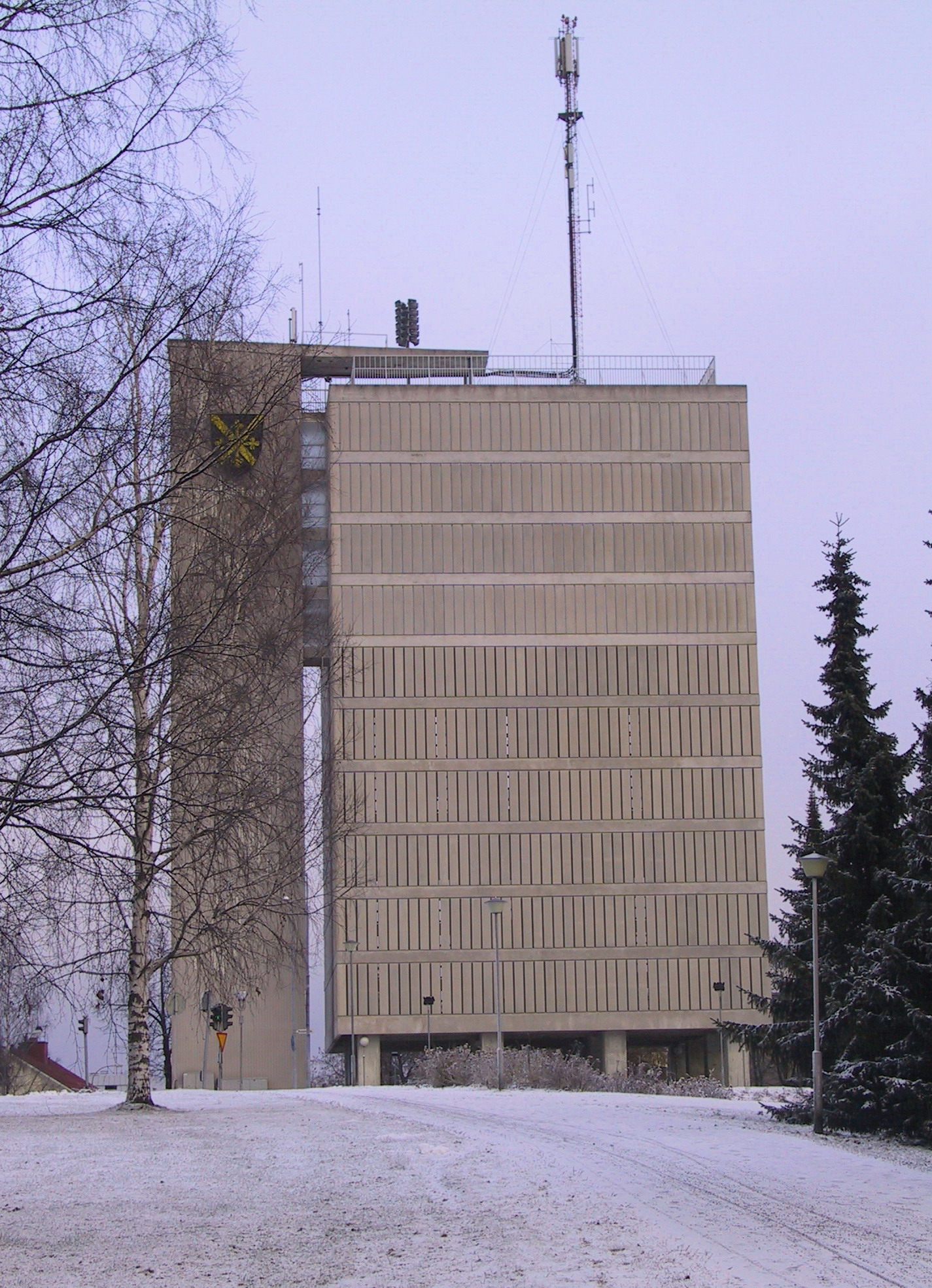
Pieksämäki water tower

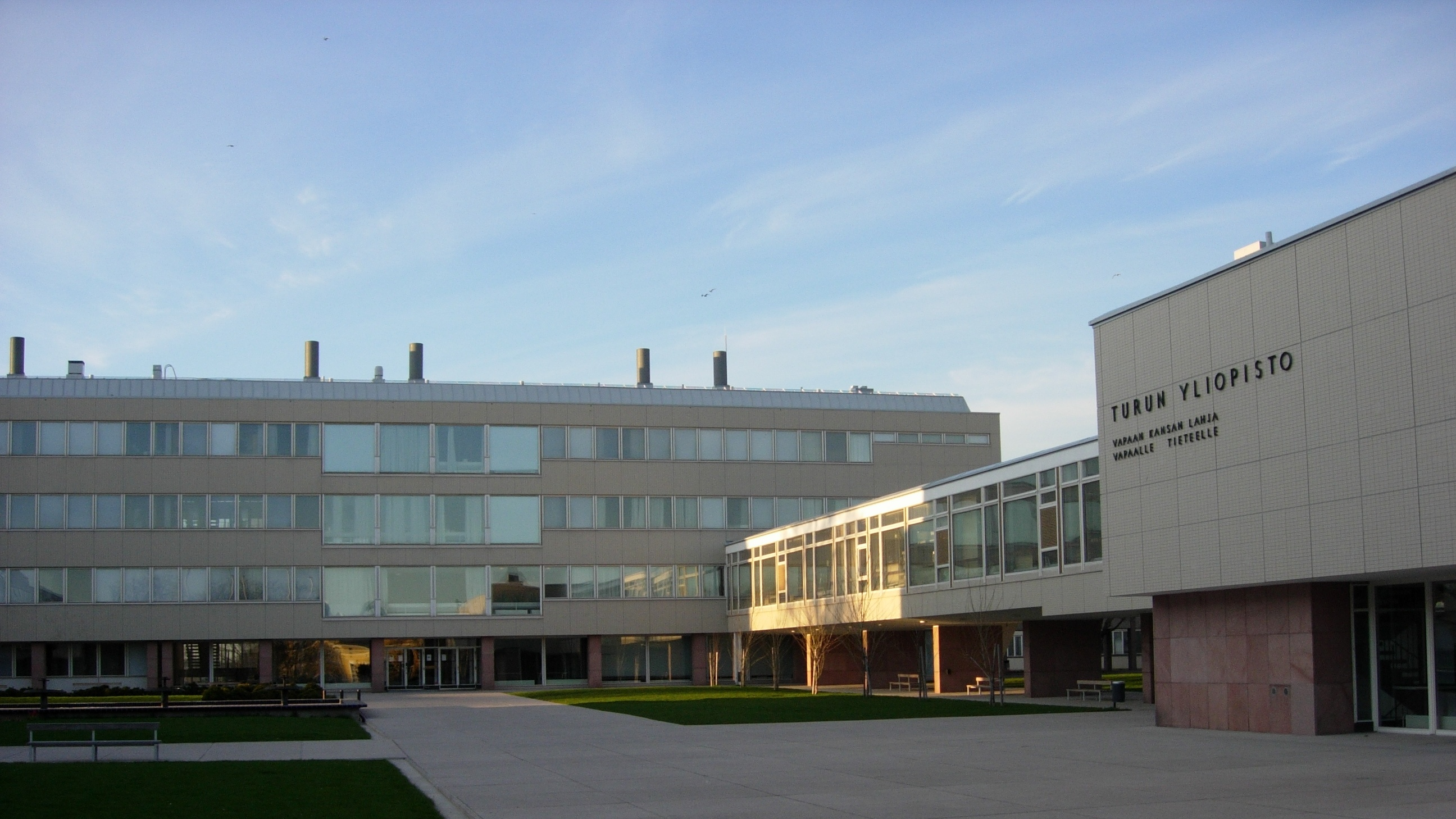
University of Turku central plaza

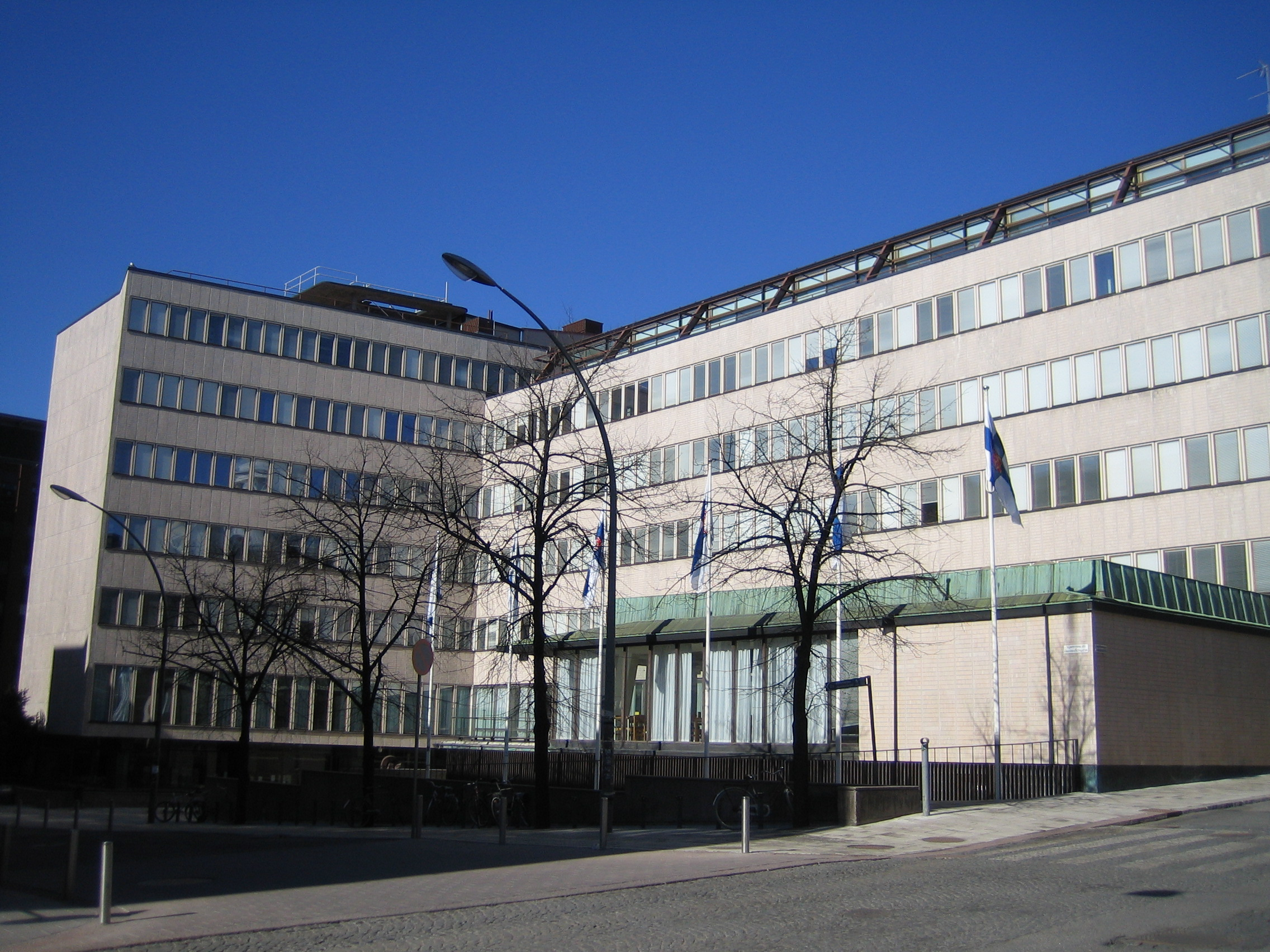
Porthania

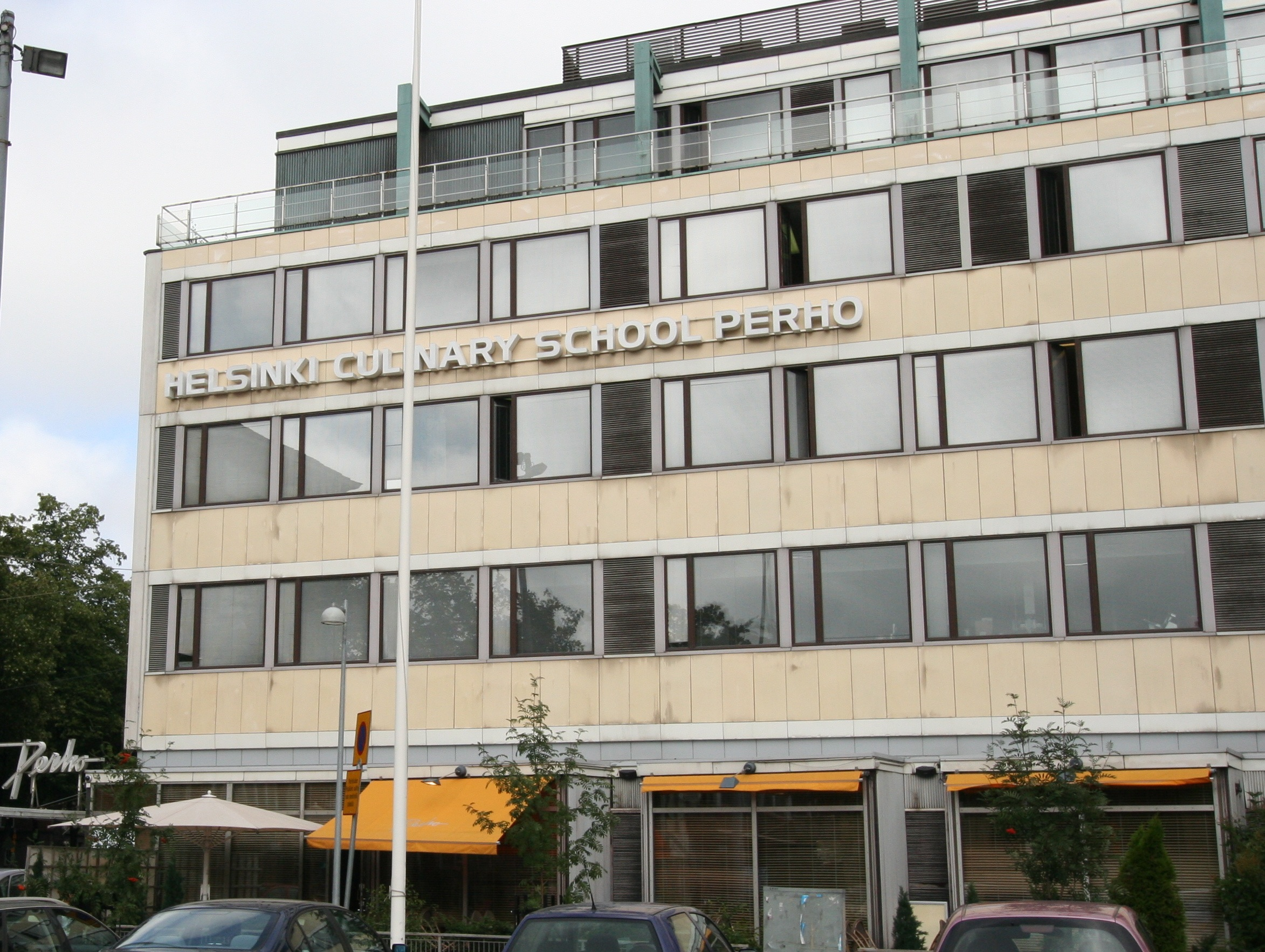
Culinary school Perho

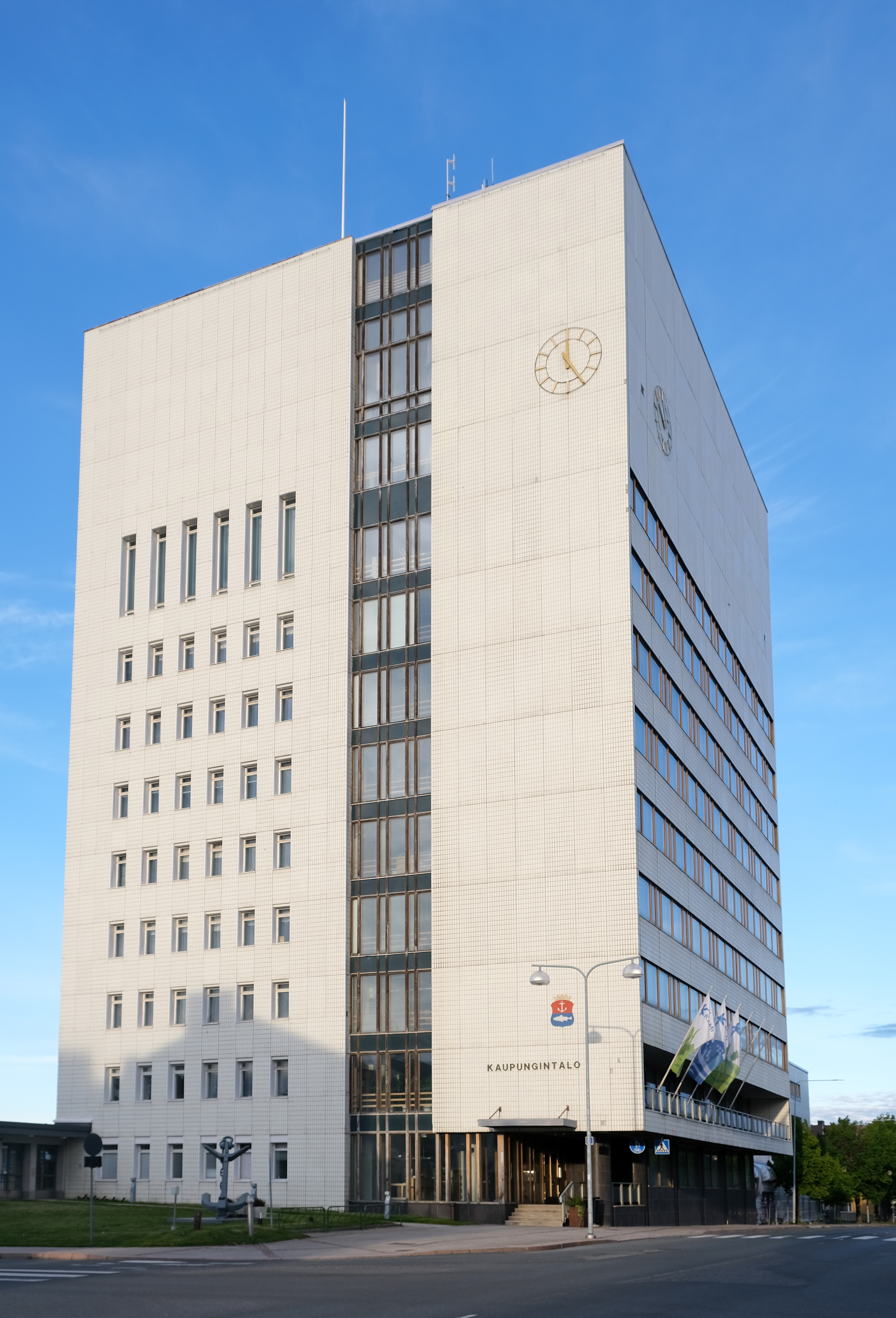
Kemi city hall

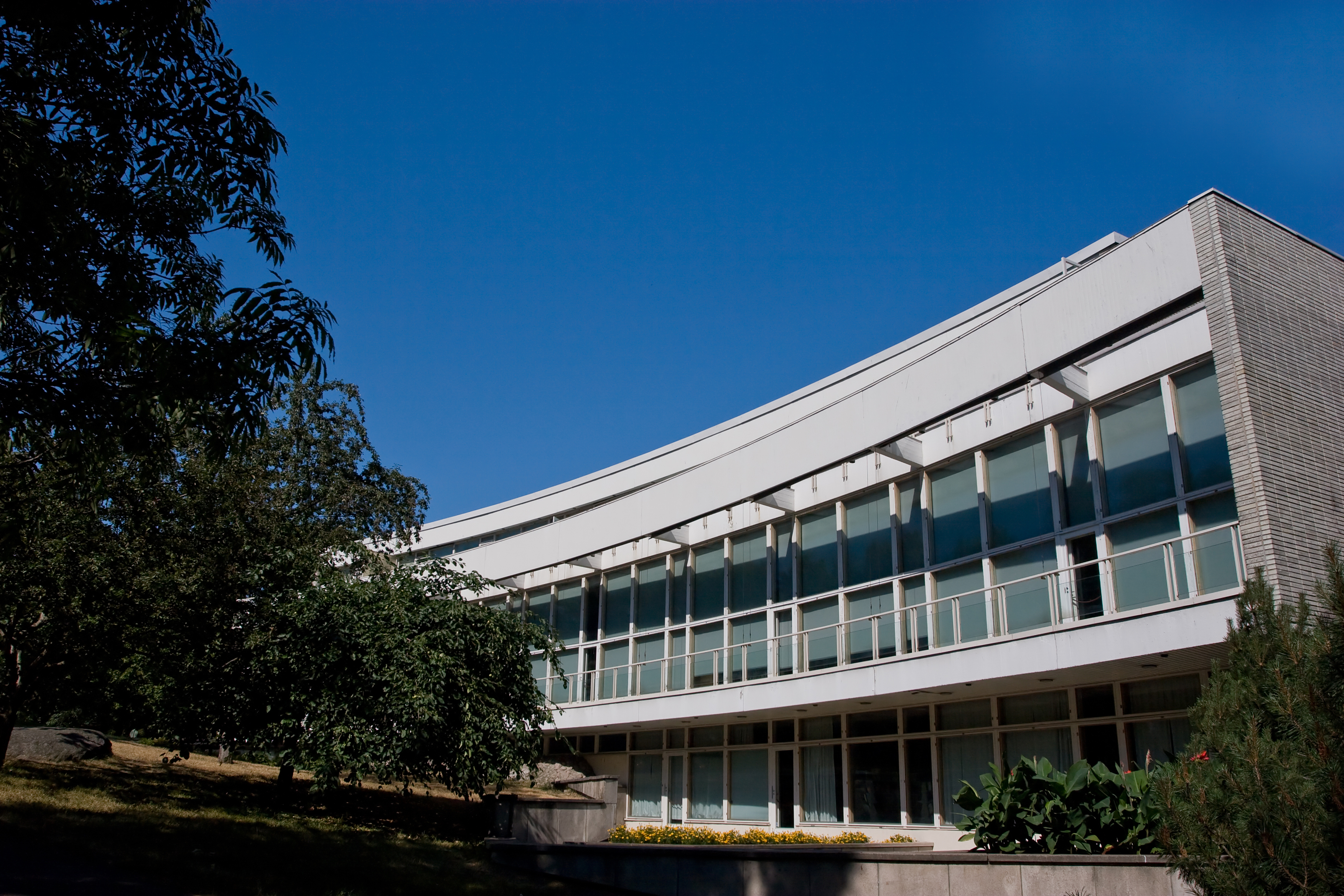
Töölö Library
