= Finlandia Hall =

Concert venue in Helsinki

- Finnish: Finlandia-talo; Swedish: Finlandiahuset
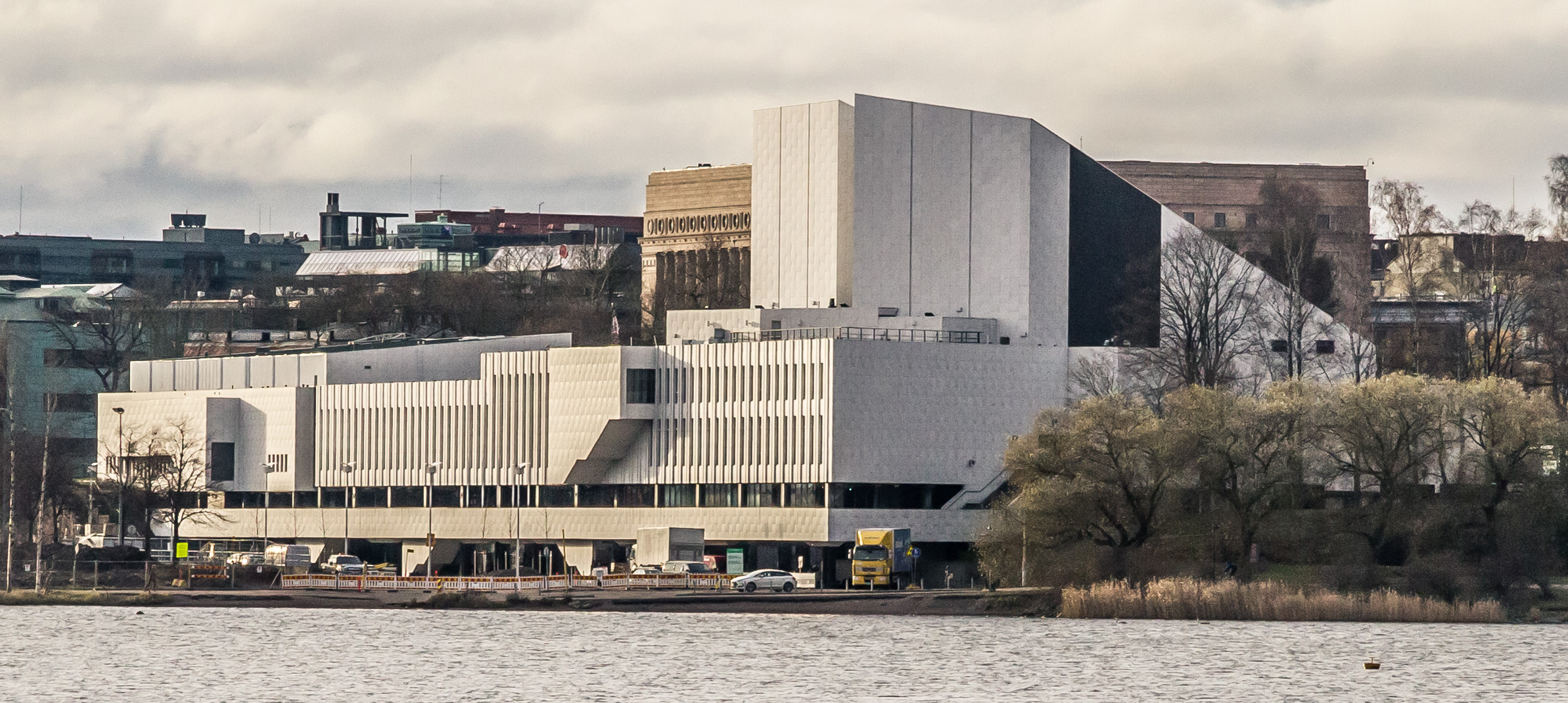
- Finlandia Hall in 2014.

- Location within Finland

General information
- Location: Finlandia Park
- Coordinates: 60°10′33″N 24°55′59″E
- Construction started: December 1967
- Completed: 2 December 1971

Technical details
- Floor area: 20,524 m^{2} (220,920 sq ft)

Design and construction
- Architect: Alvar Aalto
- Main contractor: Construction Office Arvonen Oy (withdrew from the project) Arvo Westerlund Oy (completed the project)

UNESCO World Heritage Site
- Official name: Finlandia Hall, Helsinki
- Part of: Aalto Works
- Criteria: Cultural: ii
- Reference: 1752
- Inscription: 2026 (48th Session)

The Finlandia Hall is a congress and event venue in the centre of Helsinki on the Töölönlahti Bay, owned by the City of Helsinki. The building, which was designed by architect Alvar Aalto, was completed in 1971. Every detail in the building is designed by Aalto. The designs were completed in 1962, with building taking place between 1967 and 1971. The Congress Wing was designed in 1970 and built in 1973–1975. In 2011, the building was expanded with new exhibition and meeting facilities.

The inauguration of the Finlandia Hall was celebrated on 2 December 1971. The inauguration concert included the first performance of Einojuhani Rautavaara's Meren tytär ('Daughter of the Sea') and Aulis Sallinen's Symphony (opus 24), as well as Sibelius's violin concerto with Isaac Stern as the violin soloist of the Helsinki Philharmonic Orchestra.

Finlandia Hall is known as the venue for the OSCE Summit (Conference on Security and Co-operation in Europe) held in August 1975, attended by 35 world leaders, including the leader of the Soviet Union, Leonid Brezhnev, and the President of the United States, Gerald Ford. In July 2026, the Finlandia Hall, along with 12 other Aalto Works, was designated by UNESCO as a World Heritage Site.

== Architecture ==
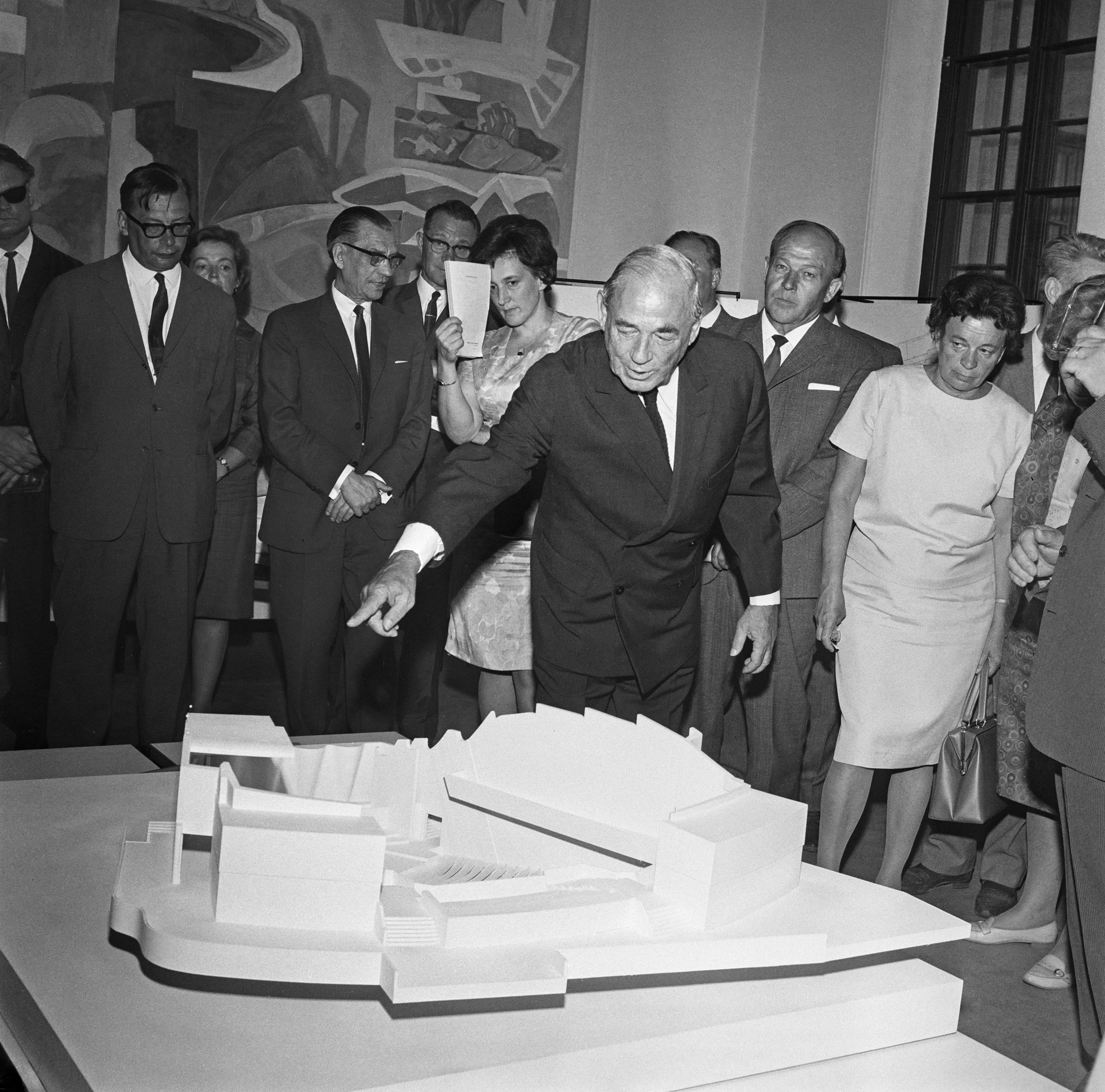
Architect Alvar Aalto presents the model of Finlandia concert hall in Helsinki 1966

The Finlandia Hall and its Congress wing was the only part of a plan for a grand new monumental centre for Helsinki around the Töölö Bay area, designed by Alvar Aalto from 1959 to 1976, to actually be built. The main feature of the Finlandia Hall building is a tower-like section with a sloping roof. Alvar Aalto's idea behind the design was that a high empty space would provide better acoustics. A lattice ceiling hides the space to the audience but it allows the creation of the same deep post-echo as tall church towers. Aalto used Italian Carrara marble in both indoor and outdoor surfaces as a contrast to black granite. For Aalto, the marble was a tie to the Mediterranean culture, which he wanted to bring to Finland.

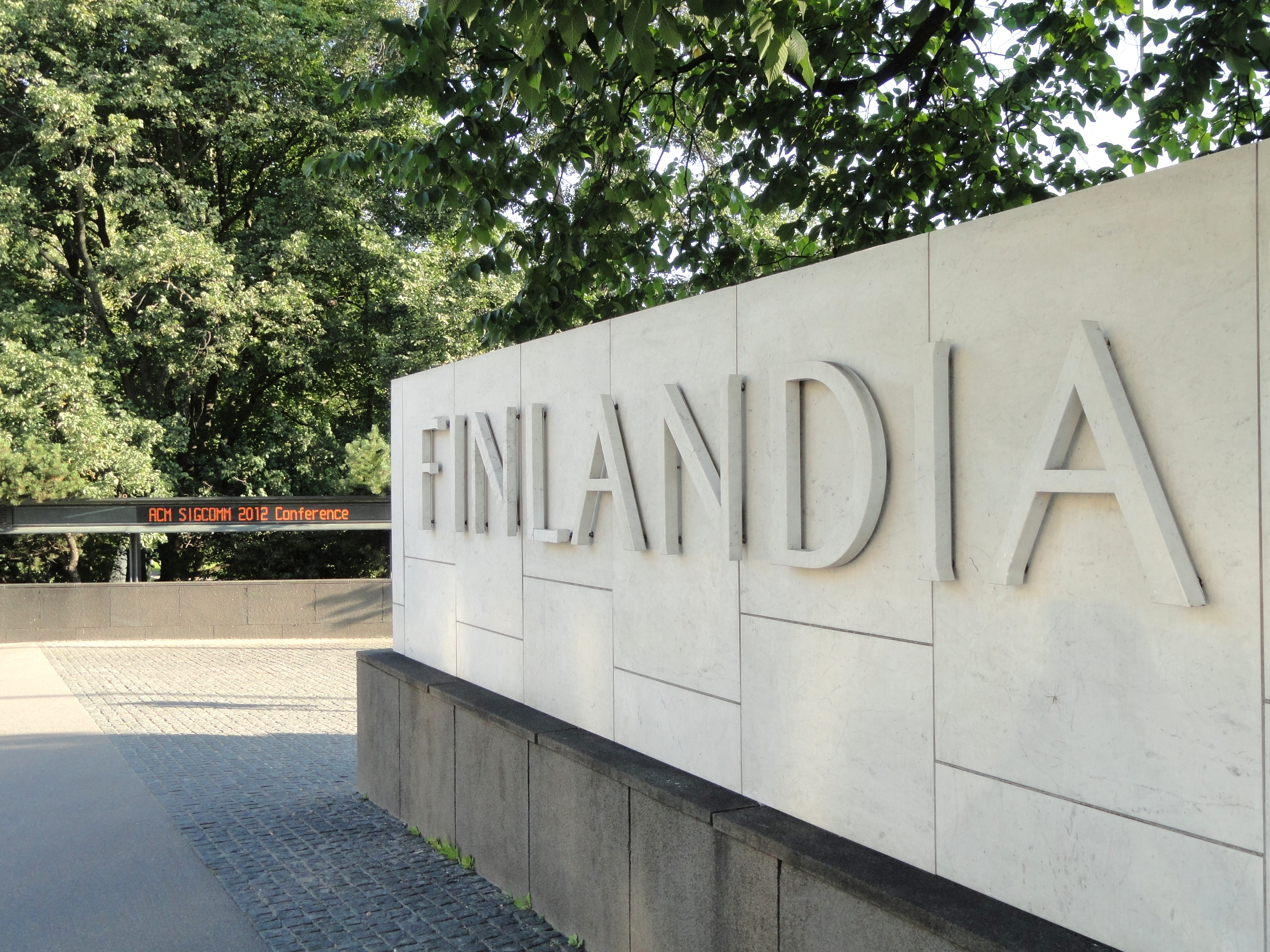
Entry.

Finlandia Hall features an optical illusion: the National Museum building on the other side of the street seems to rise from the edge of the Finlandia Hall tower. The effect is created by a black trapezium on the white marble surface of the Finlandia Hall tower. The trapezium has been measured to fit the rising tower of the National Museum when the Finlandia Hall is viewed from the eastern shore of the Töölönlahti Bay. Aalto liked to create optical illusions. Another example of this can be found on the pedestrian path behind the library building of the Helsinki University of Technology (current Aalto University) in Espoo.

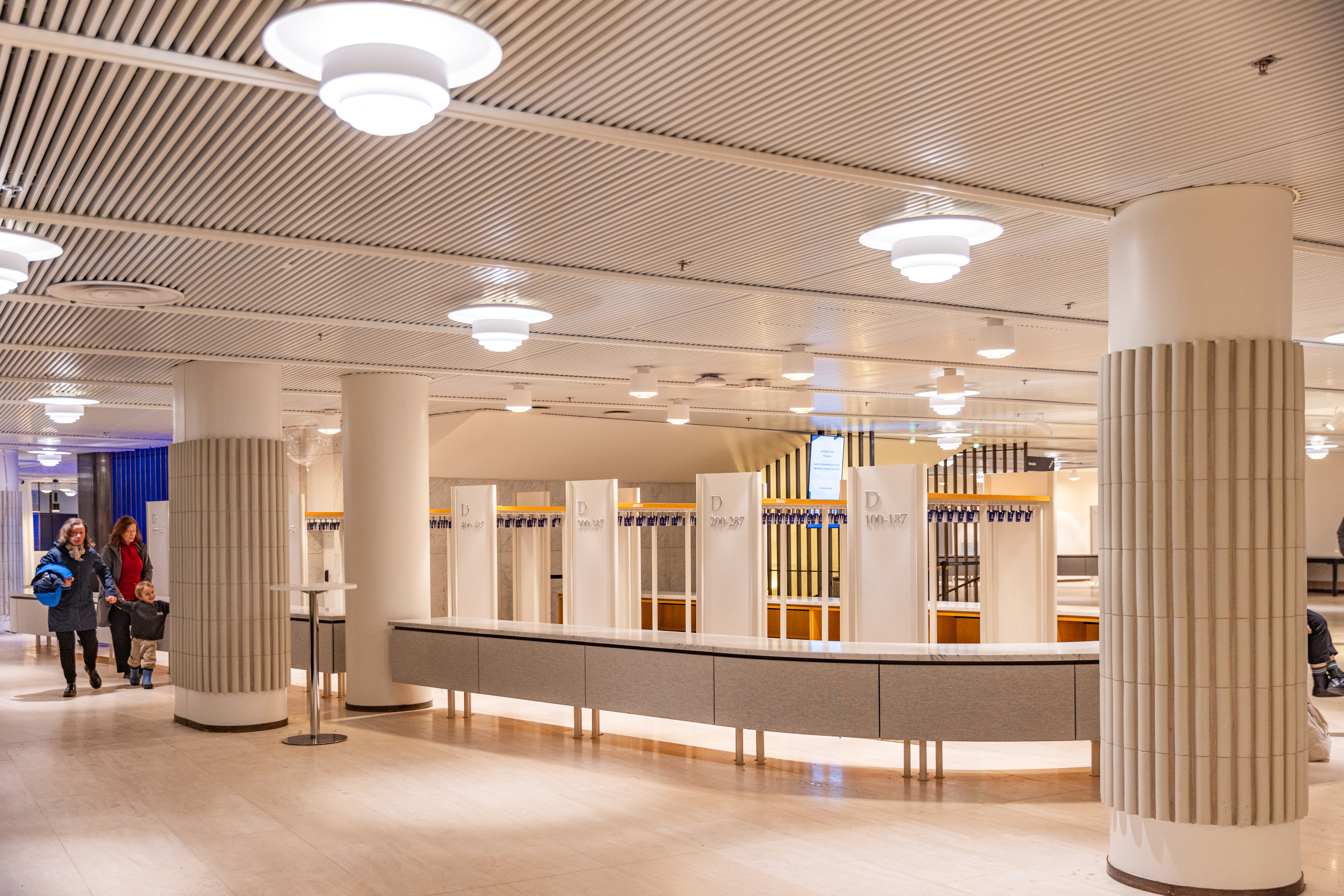
Coat rack.

The interior design of the building is a tribute to the principle of the Gesamtkunstwerk, that is, the total work of art. The design of each lamp, piece of furniture, panel, flooring material and decorative board is a reflection of Aalto's maturity resulting from his long career as an architect as well as designer of lamps, furniture and fixtures such as door handles. All the materials speak the language of nature, without technically artificial tones. This is because Aalto's basic view was that architecture should create a frame for human beings. In the Finlandia Hall, the focus is not on extraordinary forms or ostentatious interior, but rather on the audience and on the performers. According to Aalto, the audience at the Finlandia Hall need not dress up like people used to in the opera house foyers and gilded concert halls of the old days. What people wear should be as genuine and natural as the environment in the building.

== Main building ==
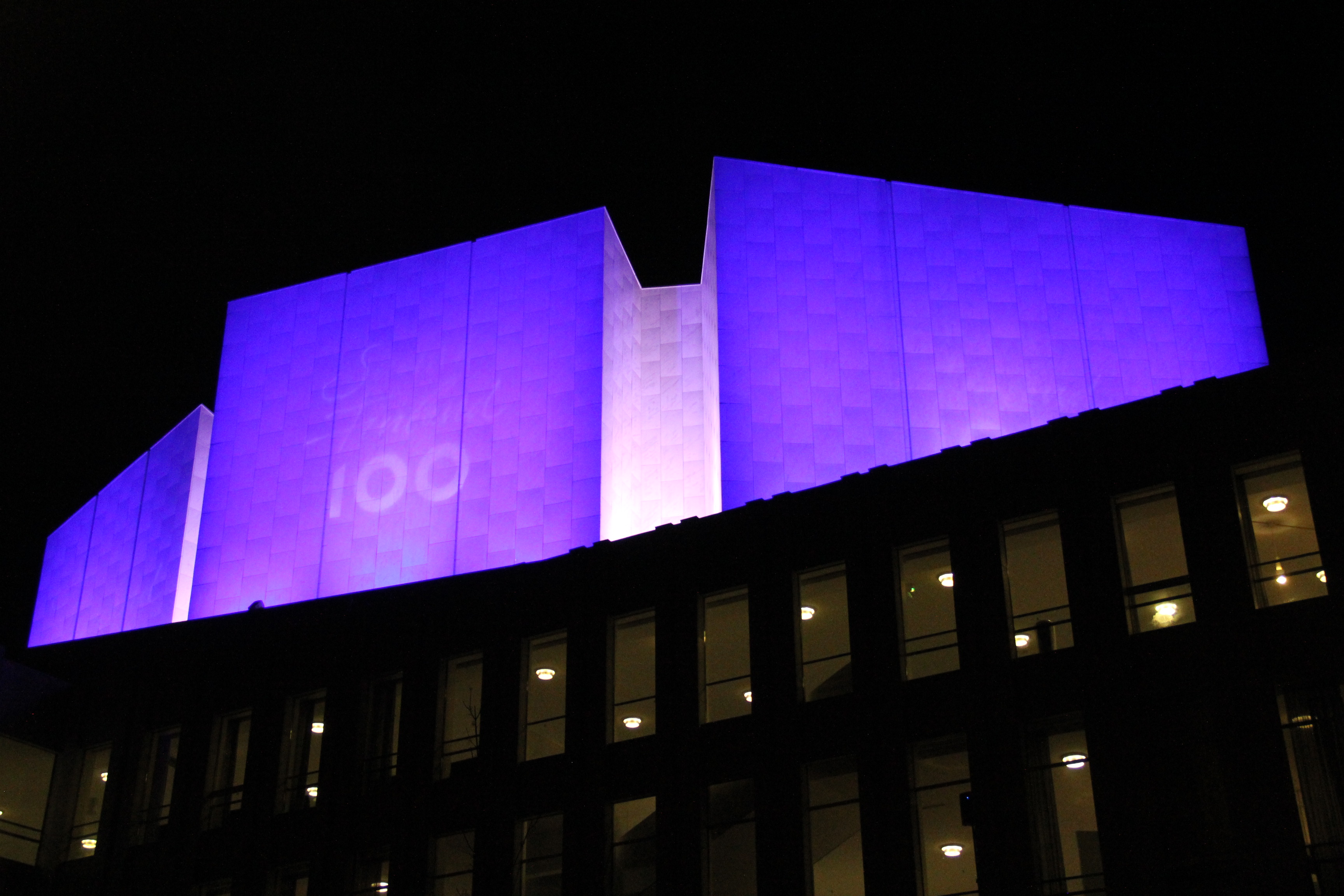
Finland's centennial celebration in 2017.

The main building houses the Main Auditorium, Helsinki Hall, Terrace Hall, Elissa Hall, Aurora Hall, Veranda, and Finlandia Restaurant, as well as Cafe Veranda and Galleria Veranda.

Finlandia Hall underwent an extensive three-year renovation, and reopened to the public on 4 January 2025. The renovation that cost 136 million euros was carried out in a way that respected architect Alvar Aalto's legacy.

=== Renovation and new façade ===
Problems with the durability of the original Carrara marble cladding had already appeared in the 1990s, when several slabs had to be replaced. After further decades of weathering, a complete renewal of the exterior became necessary. Between 2022 and the end of 2023, the façade was rebuilt using marble of the type Lasa Bianco Nuvolato from South Tyrol. The choice was based on results from European research projects on the long-term performance of marble façades and on extensive technical testing of the material. In total, about 6,800 square metres of marble were installed. The architectural supervision of the renovation was carried out by Finnish architect Teemu Tuomi of Architects NRT. The renovated main building was officially reopened on 4 January 2025.

== Finlandia Hall ==
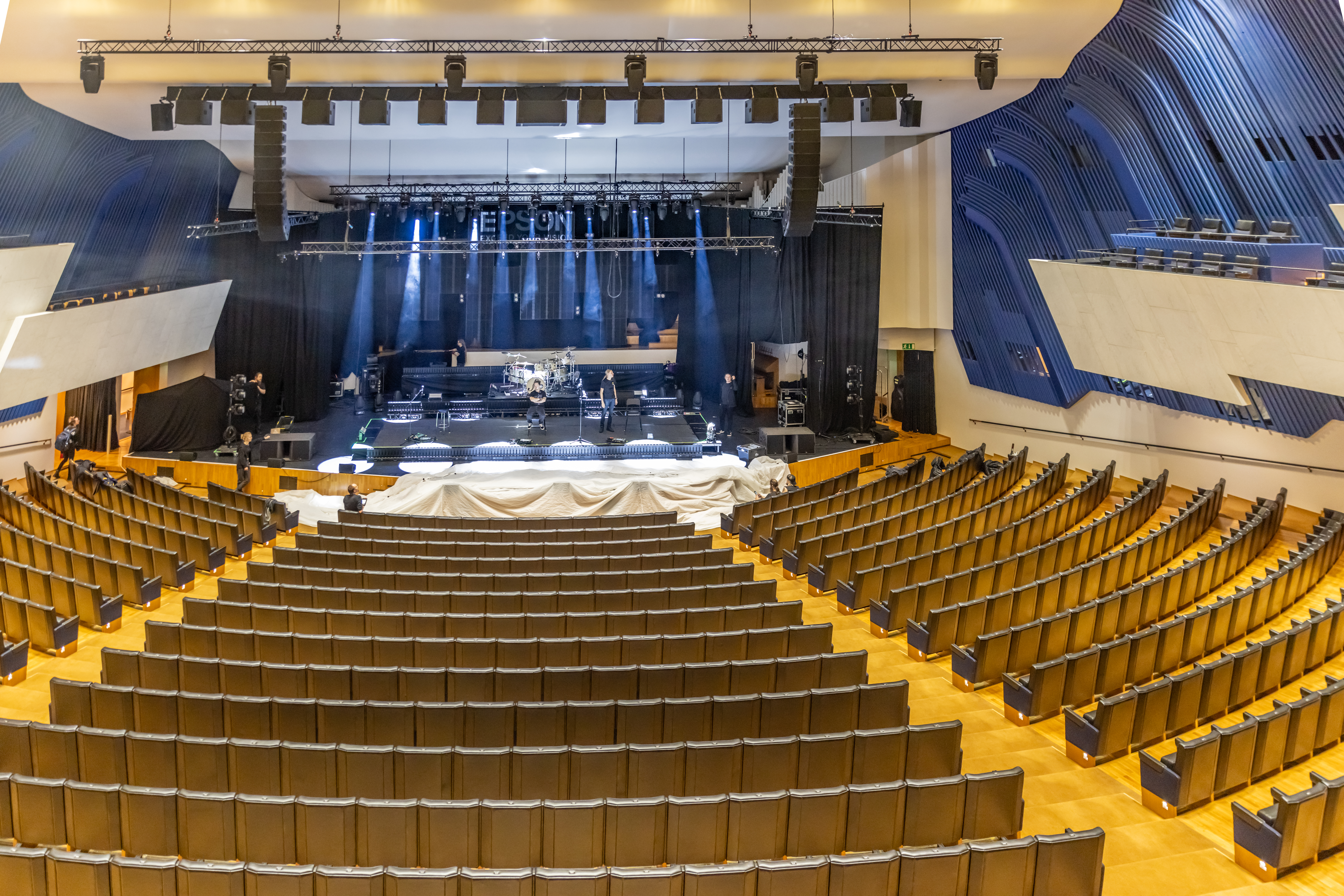
The Finlandia Hall.

The Finlandia Hall has been a popular venue for meetings, congresses, festivities, concerts and events from the very beginning. The Finlandia Hall seats 1700 people, 1200 in the stalls and 500 in the balcony. The floor is oak parquet and the blue sections of the wall are Finnish birch. The stage is 14 metres wide. It consists of several modular platforms. In the middle, there is an elevator to the storage rooms located on two floors underneath the stage. The curtain is designed by Dora Jung, a Finnish textile designer.

The Finlandia Hall has served as a venue for several international summit meetings, for instance for the meeting of the Second Stage of Organization for Security and Co-operation in Europe in 1975, which was attended by General Secretary Brezhnev from the Soviet Union and President Ford from the United States. In the meeting, every second seat row was removed to accommodate desks for the participants.

Several other heads of states have also given speeches in the concert hall, e.g. President Ronald Reagan, General Secretary Mikhail Gorbachev, President George H. W. Bush, Pope John Paul II, and the 14th Dalai Lama.

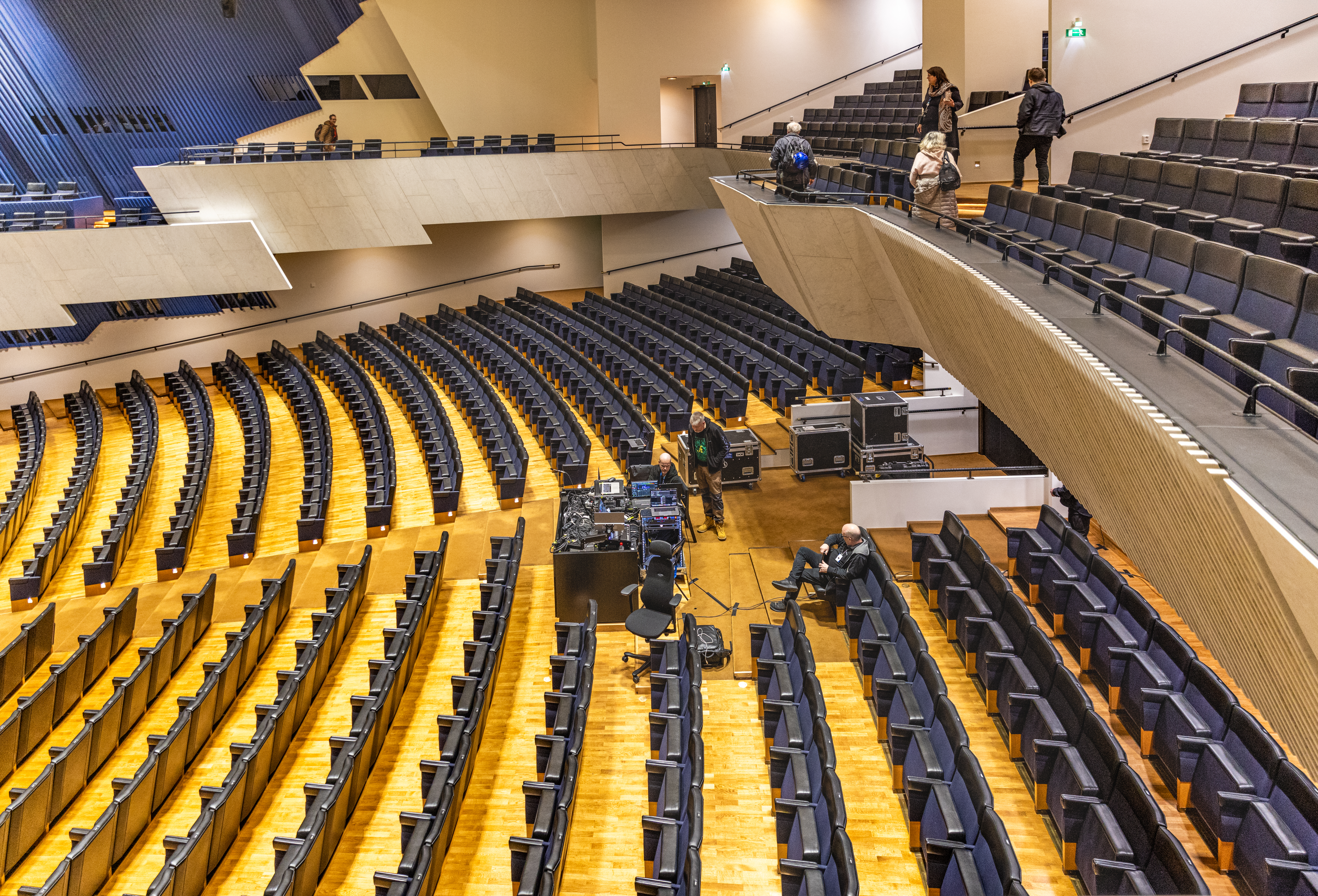
Finlandia Hall.

There has been a lot of discussion about the acoustics of the Finlandia Hall. In the beginning, there were problems, mainly because Aalto wanted the space to be like a medieval church in which the acoustics are known to be good. The tower section shown here was fully open. In the reparations that took place later, the ceiling was lowered to its present height, and the height of the stage was increased by half a metre. The doors of the concert hall are covered with material made of horsehair. The organ in the Finlandia Hall, made by the Kangasala Organ Factory, was the first concert hall organ in Finland. The front section of the organ was also designed by Alvar Aalto.

The interior of the Finlandia Hall displays many themes that are typical of Aalto. The Finlandia Hall is a simplified version of the concert hall in the Aalto Theatre, i.e. the Essen Opera House in Germany.

== Piazza ==
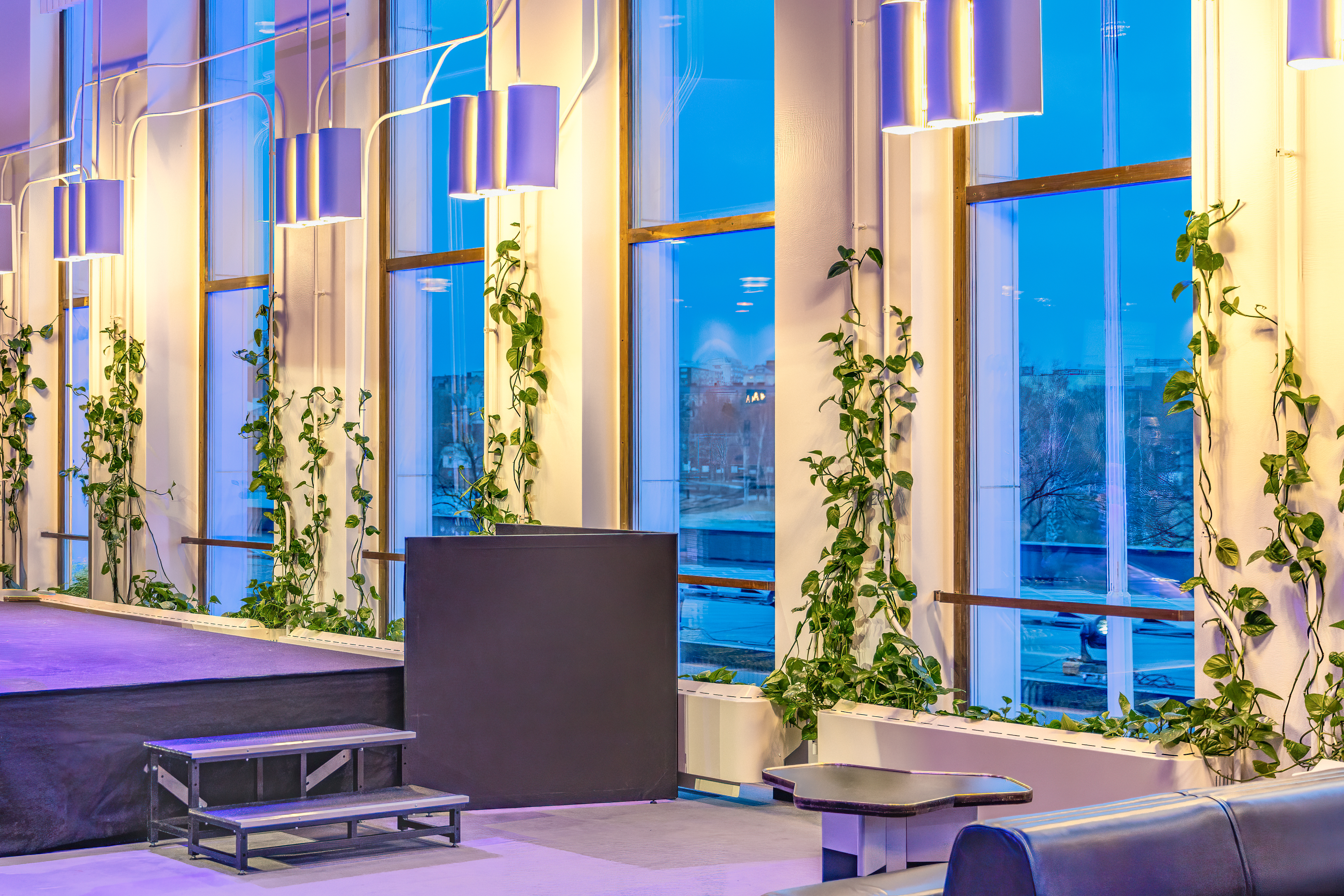
Main foyer.

Piazza is a large foyer that has much natural light. The name goes back to Italy, the country that Aalto admired greatly, its market places and squares where people gathered to see each other. The colours are subdued and quiet. The floor or the foyer is covered with high-quality English wool carpeting.

== Helsinki Hall ==
The Helsinki Hall has 340 seats and a foyer and is used for various types of event. It has features that resemble the church hall that Aalto designed for Detmerode, Wolfsburg, Germany. Especially the roof is copied from it. The “panels” in the ceiling are American Oregon pine. There is only one sharp angle in the Hall.

== Finlandia Restaurant ==
The Finlandia Restaurant consists of three dining rooms separated by movable walls. As a single space, the restaurant seats 380 people and accommodates a cocktail party for 650 people. Combining the restaurant and the adjoining foyer allows the arrangement of catering for almost 1300 people and cocktail parties for up to 2500 people.

== Congress Wing ==
The Congress Wing was completed in 1975. The special feature of the Congress Wing is the “waves” of the facade that give the building unique beauty and vivacity. The outer walls of the Wing are not direct. They curve, following the form of the terrain. On the one hand, Aalto wanted to save most of the trees on the site, but on the other hand, he wanted to avoid the monotony of direct walls. The Congress Wing contains convertible halls A, B and C, as well as several (total 13) smaller meeting rooms.

== Veranda ==
The Veranda extension of the Finlandia Hall, which was completed in 2011, is a conversion of the covered parking lot and ramp on the Karamzininranta side of the main building. The main idea of the design was a feeling of a covered outdoor space, simple. light and neutral. For example, the original nature and material of the ceiling, wall and floor surfaces were not changed if possible. The construction work was implemented in cooperation with the Finnish National Board of Antiquities. The number of new fixed elements was minimised to allow the use of the space for a large number of different functions, exhibitions, banquets, etc. The hall can be divided into spaces of various sizes by means of movable walls. Veranda's floor area, 2200 m^{2}, provides meeting space for 240–310 people. It allows the arrangement of catering for 1000 people and cocktail parties for 1700 people. The main architect for Veranda is Jyrki Iso-Aho and the interior design is by Jaakko Puro Oy. Apart from design, the leading idea in furnishing is lightness, movability and suitability for various purposes. Veranda also houses Cafe Veranda, which is open to the public, and Galleria Veranda. Both Veranda and Cafe Veranda offer a good view to the Töölönlahti Bay.

== Company ==
The Finlandia Hall is operated by an independent company. On 1 June 2008, the management organisation of the Finlandia Hall was changed into a limited liability company, Finlandia-talo Oy. The whole share capital of the company is owned by the City of Helsinki. The managing director of the company is Johanna Tolonen.

== Managing Directors of the Finlandia Hall ==
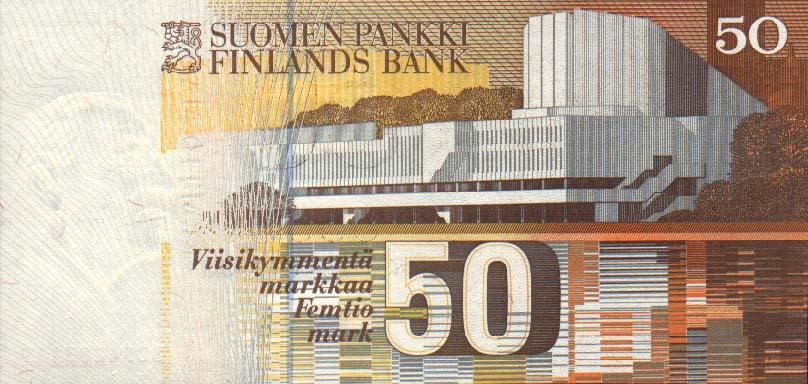
50 Finnish markka banknote with Finlandia Hall in the background

- Bengt Broms 1971–1982
- Carl Öhman 1982–1988
- Matti Kivinen 1988–2000
- Auni Palo 2000–2011
- Johanna Tolonen 2012–
