= Villa Ervi =

Residential building in Helsinki, Finland

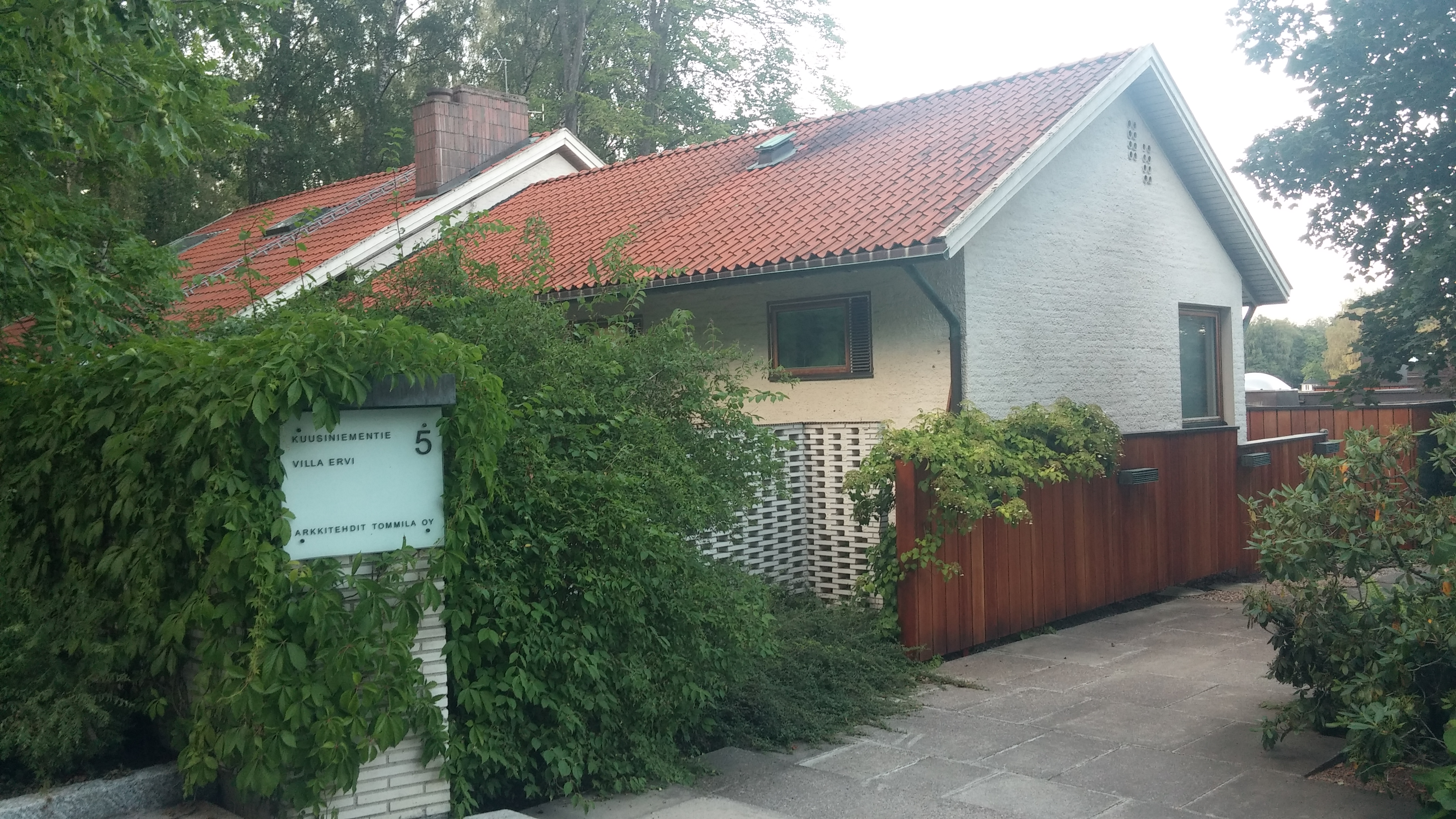
- Villa Ervi in 2014
- Interactive map of the Villa Ervi area

General information
- Type: Residential
- Architectural style: Modern architecture
- Location: Kuusiniementie 5, Kuusisaari, Helsinki, Finland
- Coordinates: 60.1882°N 24.8683°E
- Completed: 1951, extended 1962 (office annexe)

Technical details
- Material: Brick, concrete, plaster, steel
- Floor count: 2 + basement
- Floor area: 545 square metres (5,870 sq ft) (residential 222 square metres (2,390 sq ft), office 323 square metres (3,480 sq ft), other 75 square metres (810 sq ft))

Design and construction
- Architect: Aarne Ervi

Other information
- Parking: Detached garage

Villa Ervi is a detached residential building located on the Kuusisaari island in western Helsinki, Finland.

It was designed by the architect, Professor Aarne Ervi (1910–1977) as the family residence for himself and his wife, the actress Rauni Luoma. Ervi began designing it in the late 1930s, but the plan was interrupted by the breakout of the Winter War in 1939; planning permission was granted in 1943, but construction was delayed by the Continuation War. After the war, Ervi revised his plans, and changed the design from flat to a gabled roof. The design was finalised in 1950, and the building was completed in 1951. In 1962, he added an office annexe to house his design bureau; it comprises approximately half of the total floor space. At the same time, he also had a separate sauna building and an outdoor swimming pool built.

The design features white surfaces, wood and other natural materials, and large windows allowing plentiful natural light to enter. The building's interior area is 545 square metres (5,870 sq ft). The plot is 0.23 hectares (0.57 acres) in size, and has a private shoreline on the Gulf of Finland.

Juhana Lahti, a researcher at the Finnish Heritage Agency specialising in Ervi's work, has characterised the building as unique, architecturally important, and well preserved for a residential building. It is regarded as one of the most important post-war residential buildings in Finland. It is not, however, protected by a heritage designation: the building's owner since 1990, architect Mauri Tommila, did not wish to turn it into a 'museum', because he believes that since it was built as a family home, it should remain so.
