= Tapiola swimming pool =

Indoor swimming pool in Espoo, Finland

Coordinates: 60°10′43″N 024°48′26″E

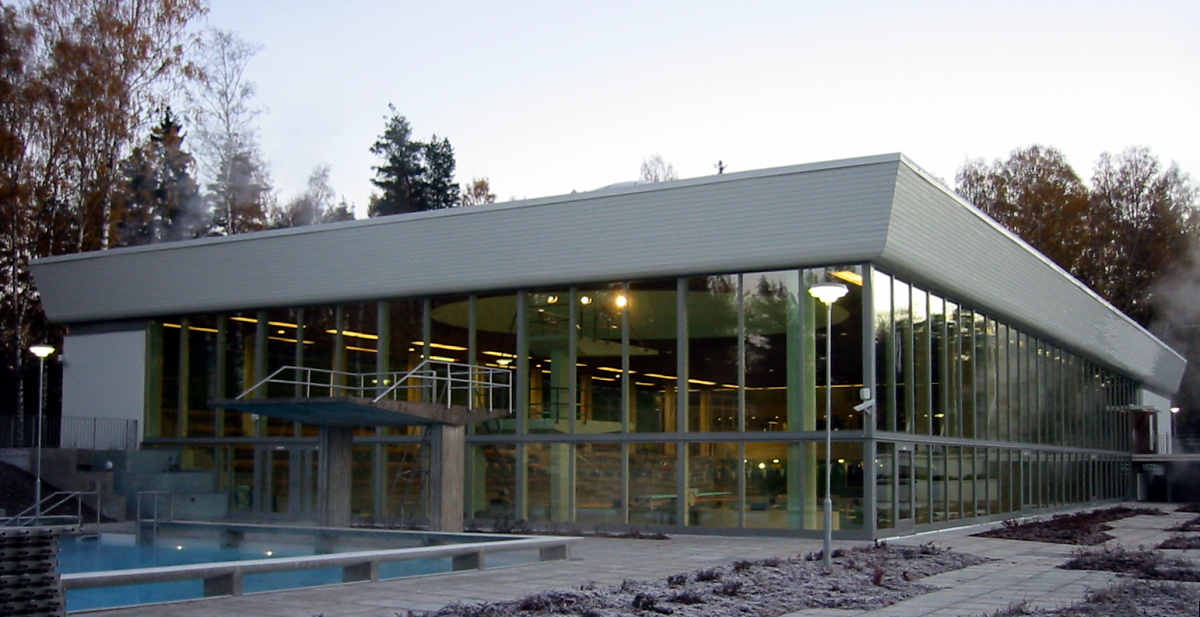
The Tapiola swimming pool on an autumn day.

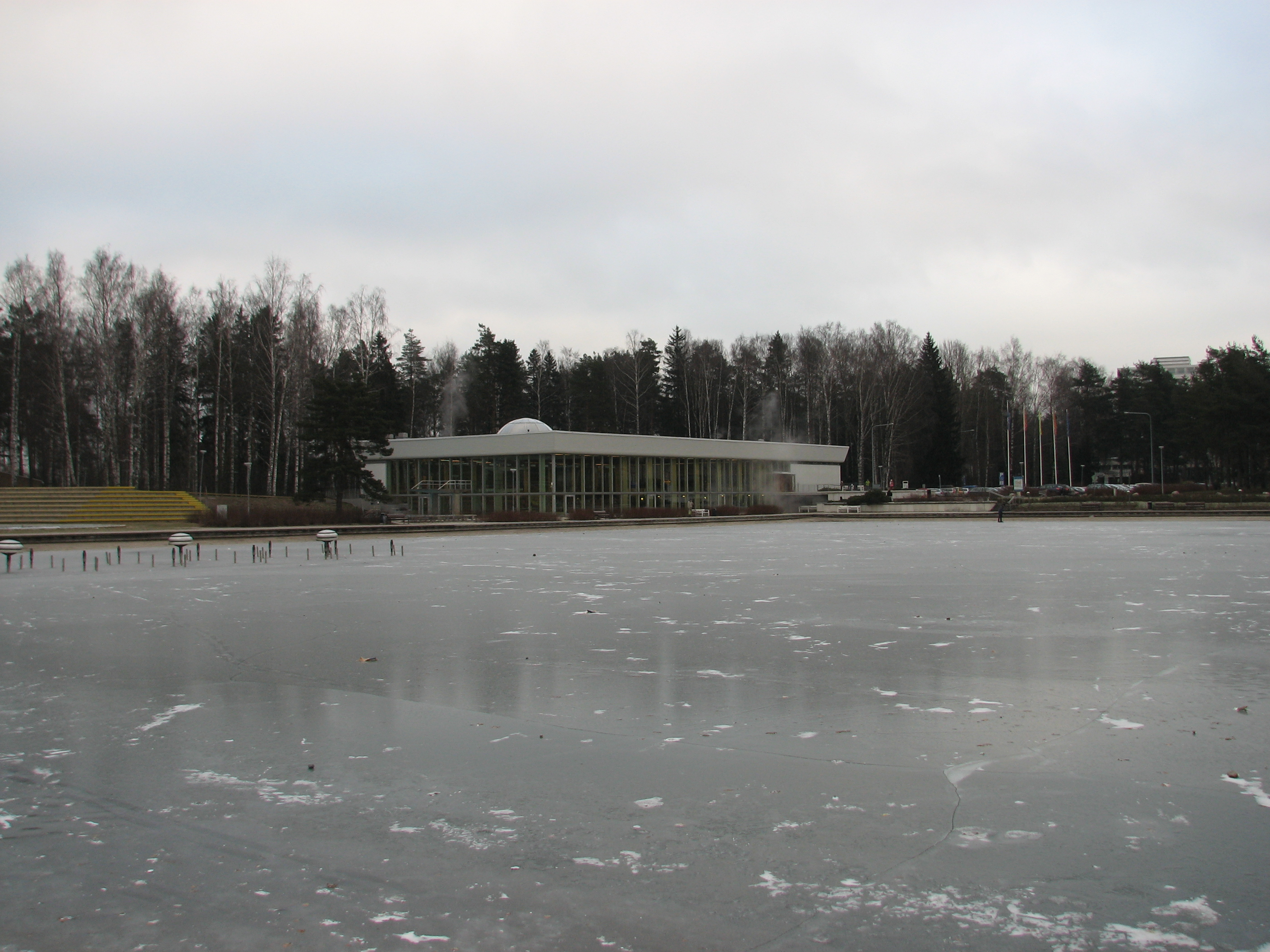
The Tapiola swimming pool in winter. The decorational fountain pool in front of it has frozen solid.

The Tapiola swimming pool is a swimming pool centre in the district of Tapiola in Espoo, Finland. The centre was designed by Aarne Ervi and built in 1965. The building was renovated by Architects NRT, and the renovation was completed in the 2000s. The renovation included an extension of the centre's premises, including steam saunas, jacuzzis, and a gym. In 2008, the centre was awarded the European Union Europa Nostra award for successful renovation.

== Closure ==
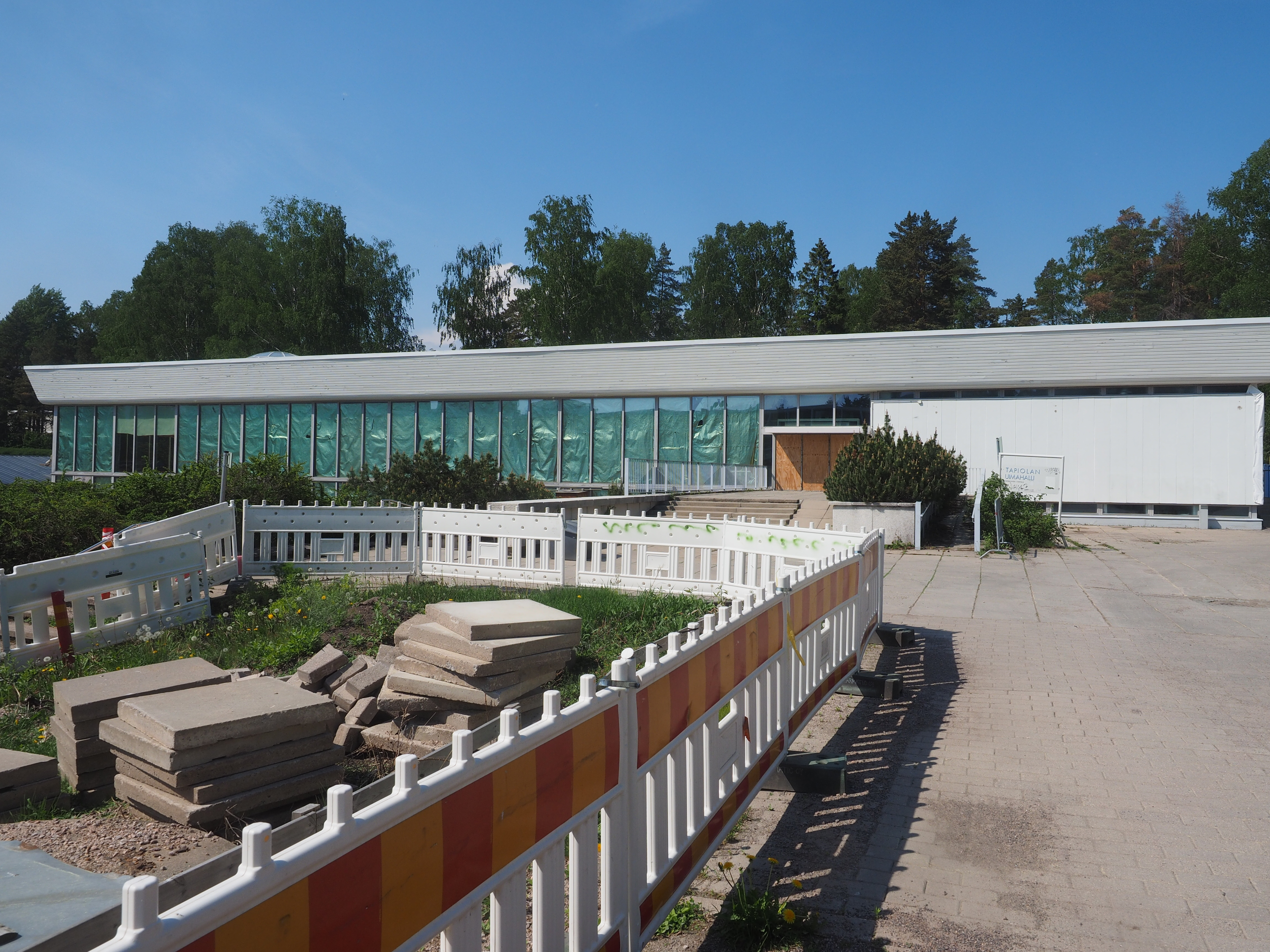
The Tapiola swimming pool has been closed because of humidity problems since 2016.

The swimming hall was closed in 2016 due to humidity problems. There has been plenty of public debate on whether to demolish the existing building and build a new swimming hall, or instead build a new one somewhere else.
