= Porthania =

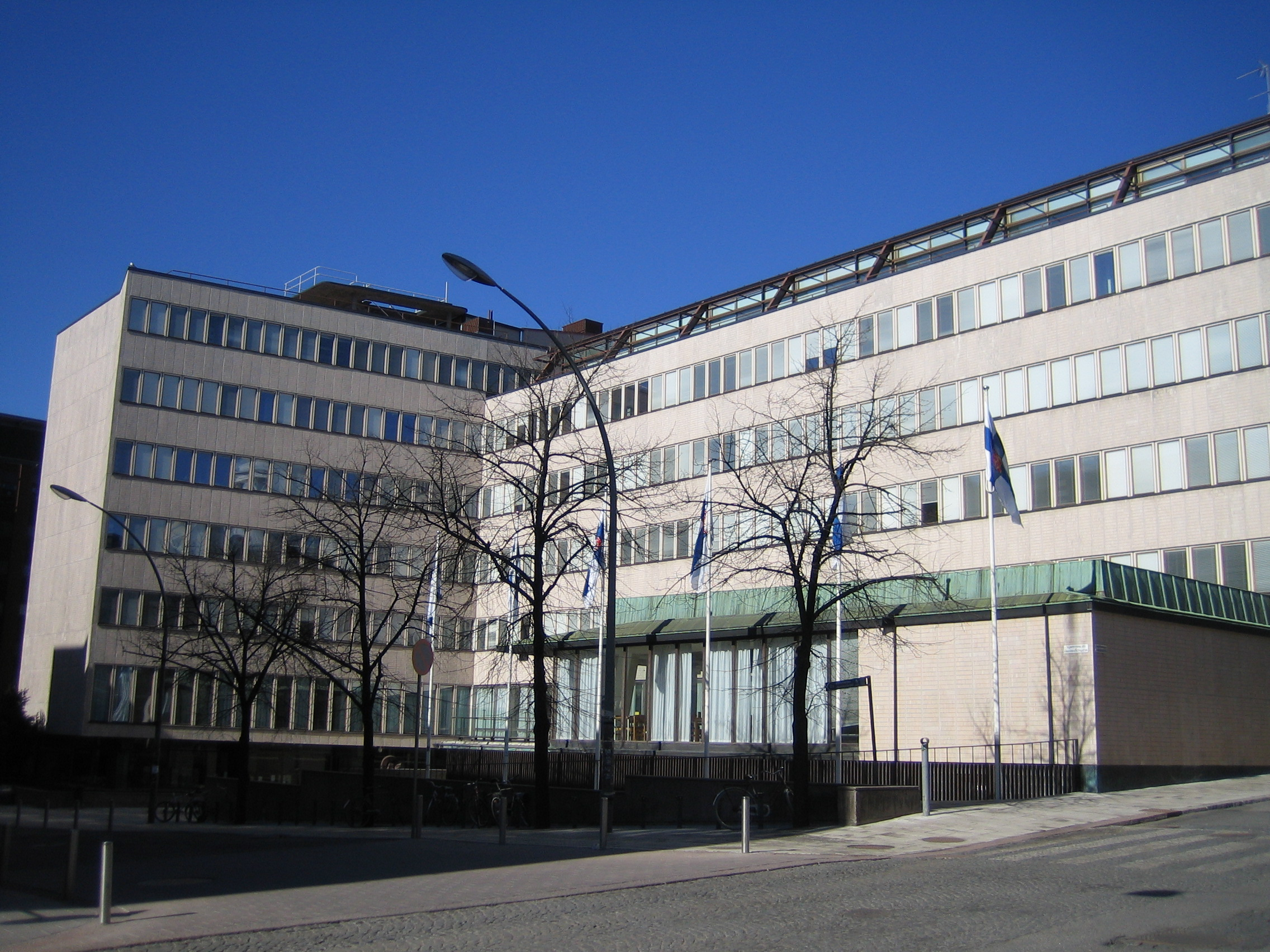
- Interactive map of the Porthania area

General information
- Type: University building
- Architectural style: Modernism
- Location: Yliopistonkatu 3, Helsinki
- Coordinates: 60°10.2′N 24°56.9′E
- Current tenants: University of Helsinki
- Completed: 1957

Design and construction
- Architect: Aarne Ervi

Porthania is a university building located in the center of Helsinki, Finland. It is part of the city centre campus of the University of Helsinki. Designed by Aarne Ervi and completed in 1957, it is one of the notable modernist buildings from the 1950s in the center of Helsinki. The building is named after Henrik Gabriel Porthan and is currently mainly used by the Faculty of Law.

== Features ==
The heart of Porthania is the two-storeys high central hall which is decorated by two large murals by Arvid Broms and Olli Miettinen. Four auditoriums line the central hall, the largest of which seats 650 people and is still the largest auditorium in the whole university. Above the hall on the second floor is a student canteen. The upper five floors of Porthania house smaller auditoriums and offices.

== See also ==
- Kumpula Campus
- Meilahti Campus
- Viikki Campus
