= Villarreal (disambiguation) =

Vila-real is a town in Castellón, Spain

Villarreal may also refer to:

== People ==
- Brayan Villarreal (born 1988), Venezuelan Major League baseball player
- Daniela Villarreal (born 2000), Mexican musician who is the lead vocalist and guitarist of the rock band The Warning
- David Villarreal (born 1955), American serial killer
- Eugenio Torres Villarreal, ring name Konan Big, a Mexican professional wrestler, television host and rapper
- Federico Villarreal (1850–1923), 19th-century Peruvian mathematician
- José Villarreal (athlete), Venezuelan paralympic athlete
- Jose Villarreal (soccer) (born 1993), American soccer player who plays for LA Galaxy in Major League Soccer
- José Félix Villarreal (1956–2022), Mexican chess master
- José Antonio Villarreal (1924–2010), novelist
- José Luis Villarreal (born 1966), former Argentine footballer
- Javier Villarreal (born 1979), Argentine football player
- María Victoria Villareal, a placeholder name for Argentine identity cards
- Óscar Villarreal (disambiguation), the name of several people
- Paulina Villarreal (born 2002), Mexican musician who is the drummer of the rock band The Warning
- Vanessa Angélica Villarreal, American poet

== Places ==
- Villareal, Samar, Philippines
- Legutio, also known as Villarreal de Álava, Álava province, Spain
- Ciudad Real, Spain, founded as Villa Real
- Villa Real, Buenos Aires, Argentina
- Villa Real, Chetumal, former town in New Spain

== Other uses ==
- Villarreal CF, a football club in Villarreal, Castellón
- Federico Villarreal National University, in Lima, Peru

== See also ==
- Vila Real (disambiguation), the equivalent term in Portuguese
