= Villa =

Type of house

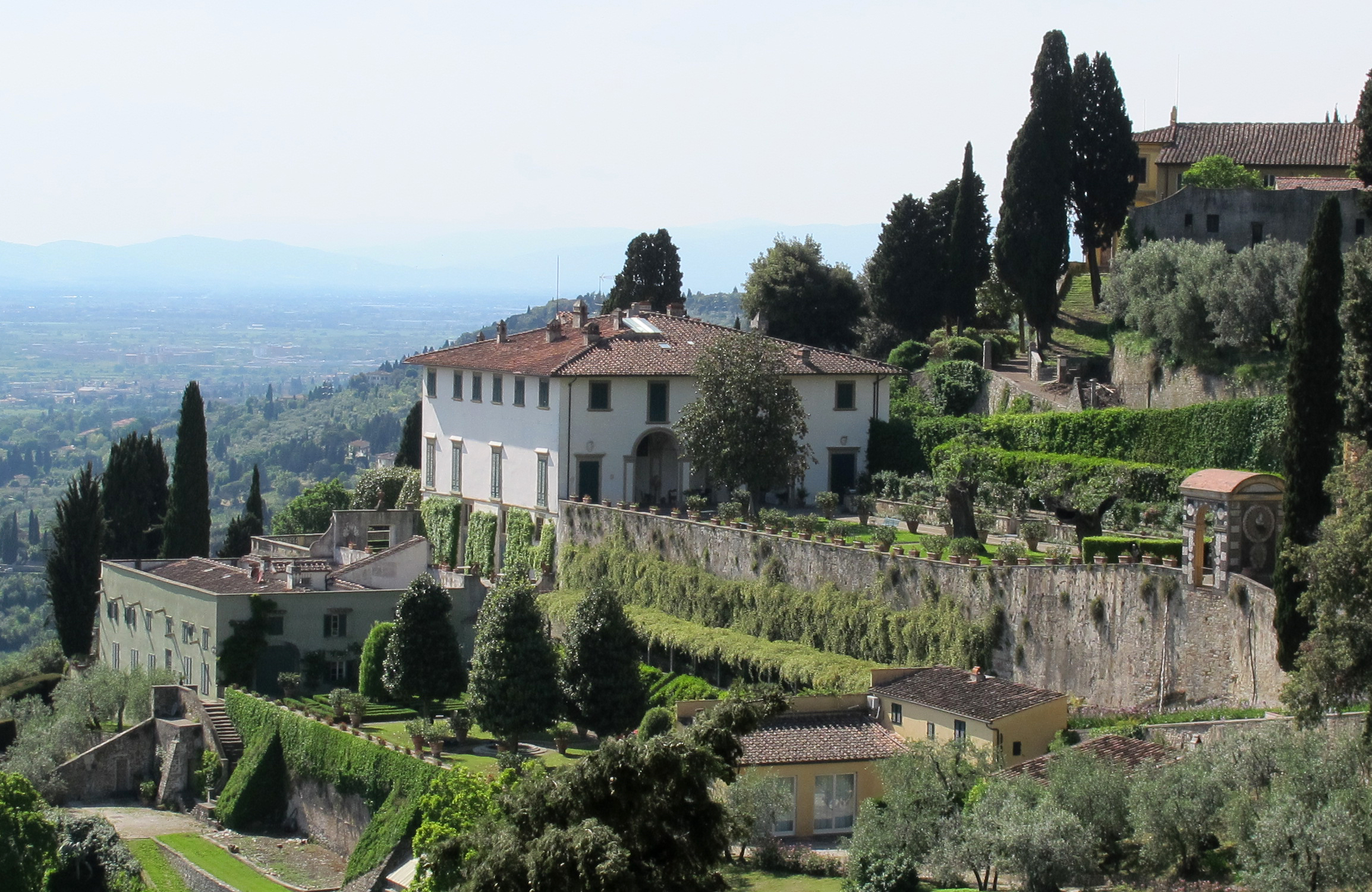
The Villa Medici in Fiesole with early terraced hillside landscape by Leon Battista Alberti

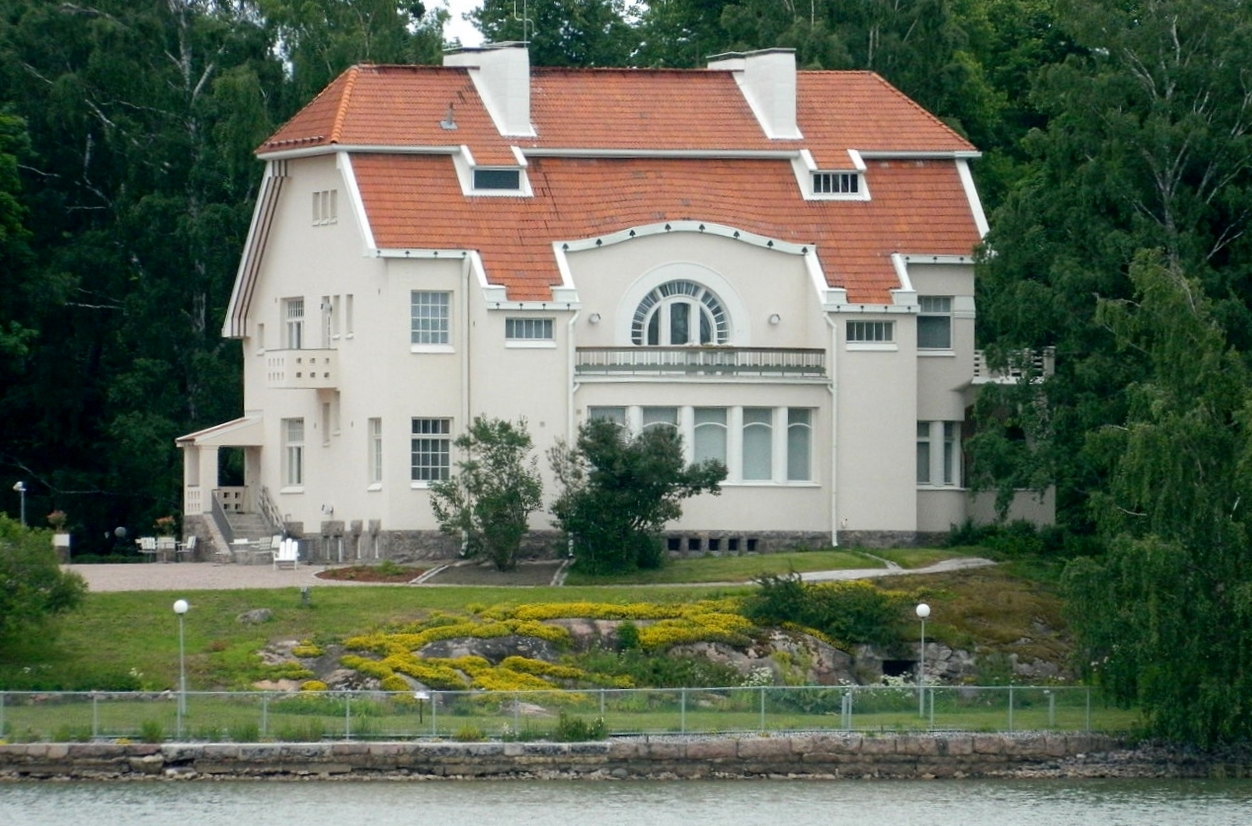
The Villa Tamminiemi, an Art Nouveau styled villa and house museum in Helsinki, Finland

A villa is a type of house that was originally an ancient Roman upper class country house that provided an escape from urban life. Since its origins in the Roman villa, the idea and function of a villa have evolved considerably. After the fall of the Roman Republic, villas became small farming compounds, which were increasingly fortified in Late Antiquity, sometimes transferred to the Church for reuse as a monastery. They gradually re-evolved through the Middle Ages into elegant upper-class country homes. In the early modern period, any comfortable detached house with a garden near a city or town was likely to be described as a villa; most surviving villas have now been engulfed by suburbia. In modern parlance, "villa" can refer to various types and sizes of residences, ranging from the suburban semi-detached double villa to, in some countries, especially around the Mediterranean, residences of above average size in the countryside.

== Roman ==
Roman villas included:

- the villa urbana, a suburban or country seat that could easily be reached from Rome or another city for a night or two. They often featured decorated rooms and porticoes.
- the villa rustica, the farm-house estate that was permanently occupied by the servants who had charge generally of the estate, which would centre on the villa itself, perhaps only seasonally occupied. The Roman villae rusticae at the heart of latifundia were the earliest versions of what later and elsewhere became called manors and plantations.
- the otium villa, for rural retirement or pleasure.

In terms of design, there was often little difference in the main residence between these types at any particular level of size, but the presence or absence of farm outbuildings reflected the size and function of the estate.

Not included as villae were the domus, city houses for the élite and privileged classes, and the insulae, blocks of apartment buildings for the rest of the population. In Satyricon (1st century CE), Petronius described the wide range of Roman dwellings. Another type of villae is the "villa maritima", a seaside villa, located on the coast.

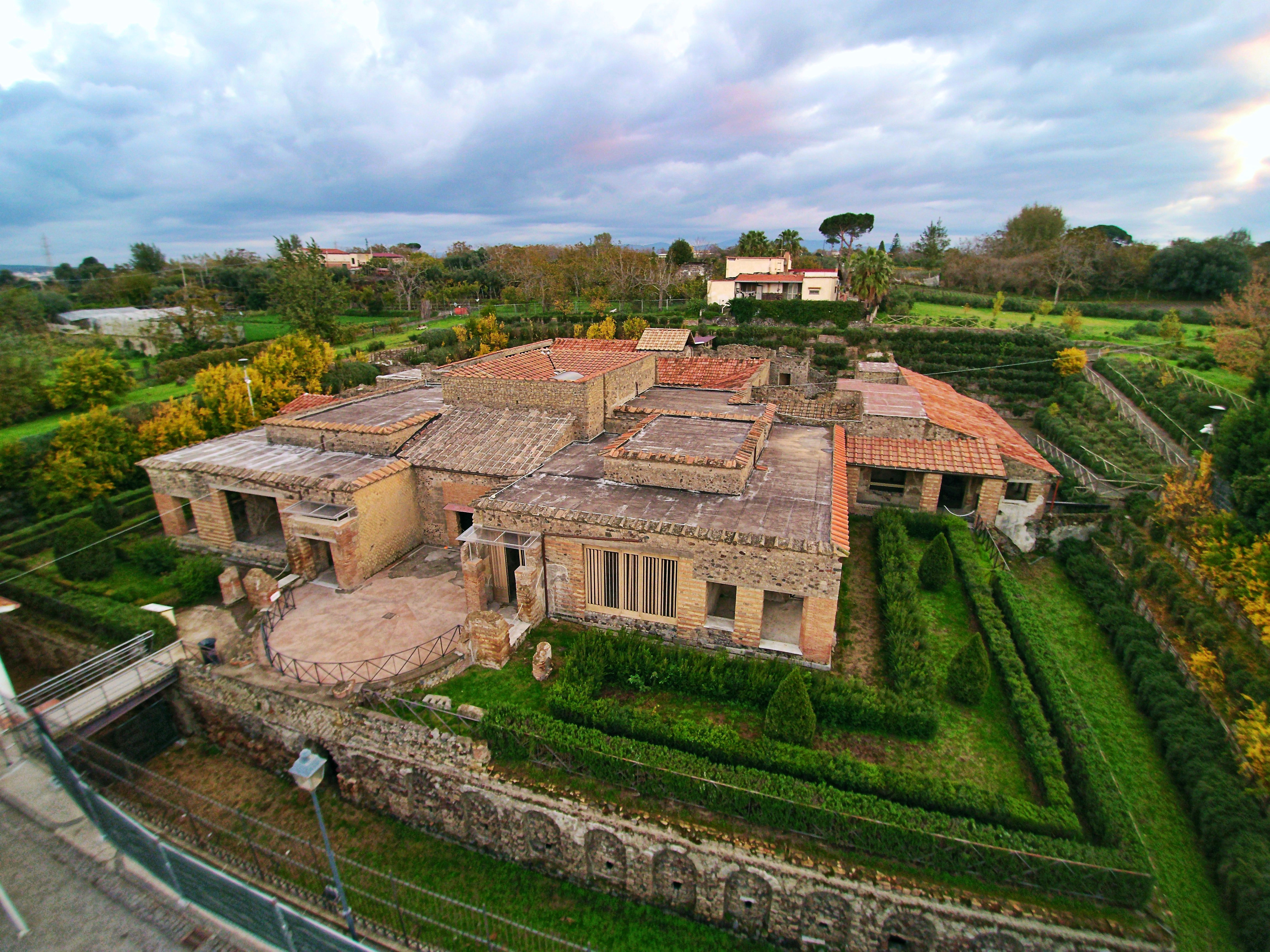
Villa of the Mysteries in Pompeii seen from above

A concentration of Imperial villas existed on the Gulf of Naples, on the Isle of Capri, at Monte Circeo and at Antium. Examples include the Villa of the Papyri in Herculaneum; and the Villa of the Mysteries and Villa of the Vettii in Pompeii.

There was an important villa maritima in Barcola near Trieste. This villa was located directly on the coast and was divided into terraces in a representation area in which luxury and power was displayed, a separate living area, a garden, some facilities open to the sea and a thermal bath. Not far from this noble place, which was already popular with the Romans because of its favorable microclimate, one of the most important Villa Maritima of its time, the Miramare Castle, was built in the 19th century.

Wealthy Romans also escaped the summer heat in the hills round Rome, especially around Tibur (Tivoli and Frascati), such as at Hadrian's Villa. Cicero allegedly possessed no fewer than seven villas, the oldest of which was near Arpinum, which he inherited. Pliny the Younger had three or four, of which the example near Laurentium is the best known from his descriptions.

Roman writers refer with satisfaction to the self-sufficiency of their latifundium villas, where they drank their own wine and pressed their own oil. This was an affectation of urban aristocrats playing at being old-fashioned virtuous Roman farmers; it has been said that the economic independence of later rural villas was a symptom of the increasing economic fragmentation of the Roman Empire.

=== In Roman Britannia ===
Archaeologists have meticulously examined numerous Roman villas in England. Like their Italian counterparts, they were complete working agrarian societies of fields and vineyards, perhaps even tileworks or quarries, ranged round a high-status power centre with its baths and gardens. The grand villa at Woodchester preserved its mosaic floors when the Anglo-Saxon parish church was built (not by chance) upon its site. Grave-diggers preparing for burials in the churchyard as late as the 18th century had to punch through the intact mosaic floors. The even more palatial villa rustica at Fishbourne near Winchester was built (uncharacteristically) as a large open rectangle, with porticos enclosing gardens entered through a portico. Towards the end of the 3rd century, Roman towns in Britain ceased to expand: like patricians near the centre of the empire, Roman Britons withdrew from the cities to their villas, which entered on a palatial building phase, a "golden age" of villa life. Villae rusticae are essential in the Empire's economy.

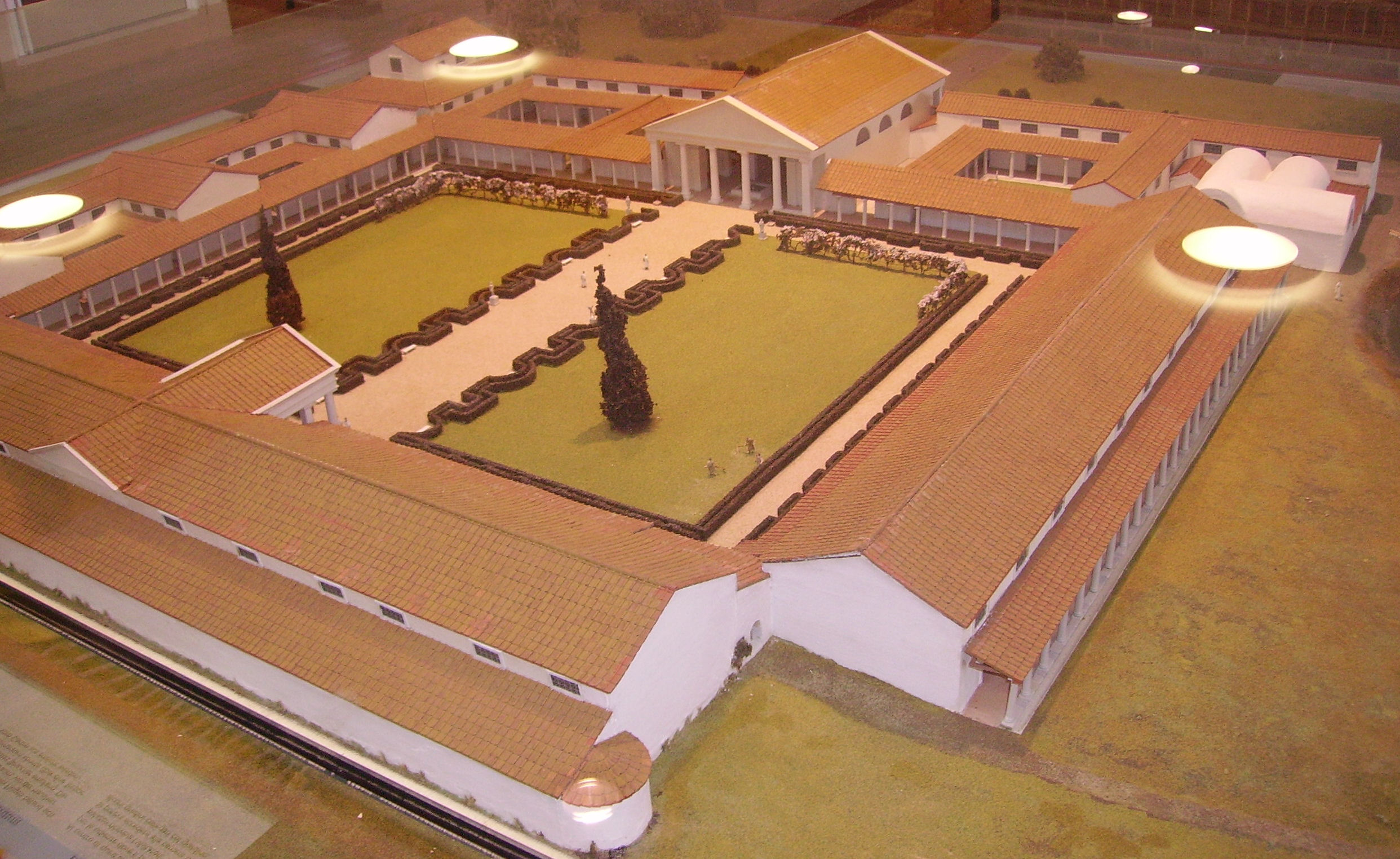
Model of Fishbourne Roman Palace, a governor's villa on the grandest scale

Two kinds of villa-plan in Roman Britain may be characteristic of Roman villas in general. The more usual plan extended wings of rooms all opening onto a linking portico, which might be extended at right angles, even to enclose a courtyard. The other kind featured an aisled central hall like a basilica, suggesting the villa owner's magisterial role. The villa buildings were often independent structures linked by their enclosed courtyards. Timber-framed construction, carefully fitted with mortises and tenons and dowelled together, set on stone footings, were the rule, replaced by stone buildings for the important ceremonial rooms. Traces of window glass have been found, as well as ironwork window grilles.

=== Monastery villas of Late Antiquity ===
With the decline and collapse of the Western Roman Empire in the fourth and fifth centuries, the villas were more and more isolated and came to be protected by walls. In England the villas were abandoned, looted, and burned by Anglo-Saxon invaders in the fifth century, but the concept of an isolated, self-sufficient agrarian working community, housed close together, survived into Anglo-Saxon culture as the vill, with its inhabitants – if formally bound to the land – as villeins.

In regions on the Continent, aristocrats and territorial magnates donated large working villas and overgrown abandoned ones to individual monks; these might become the nuclei of monasteries. In this way, the Italian villa system of late Antiquity survived into the early Medieval period in the form of monasteries that withstood the disruptions of the Gothic War (535–554) and the Lombards. About 529 Benedict of Nursia established his influential monastery of Monte Cassino in the ruins of a villa at Subiaco that had belonged to Nero.

From the sixth to the eighth century, Gallo-Roman villas in the Merovingian royal fisc were repeatedly donated as sites for monasteries under royal patronage in Gaul – Saint-Maur-des-Fossés and Fleury Abbey provide examples. In Germany a famous example is Echternach; as late as 698, Willibrord established an abbey at a Roman villa of Echternach near Trier, presented to him by Irmina, daughter of Dagobert II, king of the Franks. Kintzheim was Villa Regis, the "villa of the king". Around 590, Saint Eligius was born in a highly placed Gallo-Roman family at the 'villa' of Chaptelat near Limoges, in Aquitaine (now France). The abbey at Stavelot was founded ca 650 on the domain of a former villa near Liège and the abbey of Vézelay had a similar founding.

== Post-Roman era ==
As Europe's influence spread to other cultures, the form, and use of the villa would also spread as well. In post-Roman times a villa referred to a self-sufficient, usually fortified Italian or Gallo-Roman farmstead. It was economically as self-sufficient as a village and its inhabitants, who might be legally tied to it as serfs were villeins. The Merovingian Franks inherited the concept, followed by the Carolingian French but the later French term was basti or bastide.

Villa/Vila (or its cognates) is part of many Spanish and Portuguese placenames, like Vila Real and Villadiego: a villa/vila is a town with a charter (fuero or foral) of lesser importance than a ciudad/cidade ("city"). When it is associated with a personal name, villa was probably used in the original sense of a country estate rather than a chartered town. Later evolution has made the Hispanic distinction between villas and ciudades a purely honorific one. Madrid is the Villa y Corte, the villa considered to be separate from the formerly mobile royal court, but the much smaller Ciudad Real was declared ciudad by the Spanish crown.

== Italian Renaissance ==
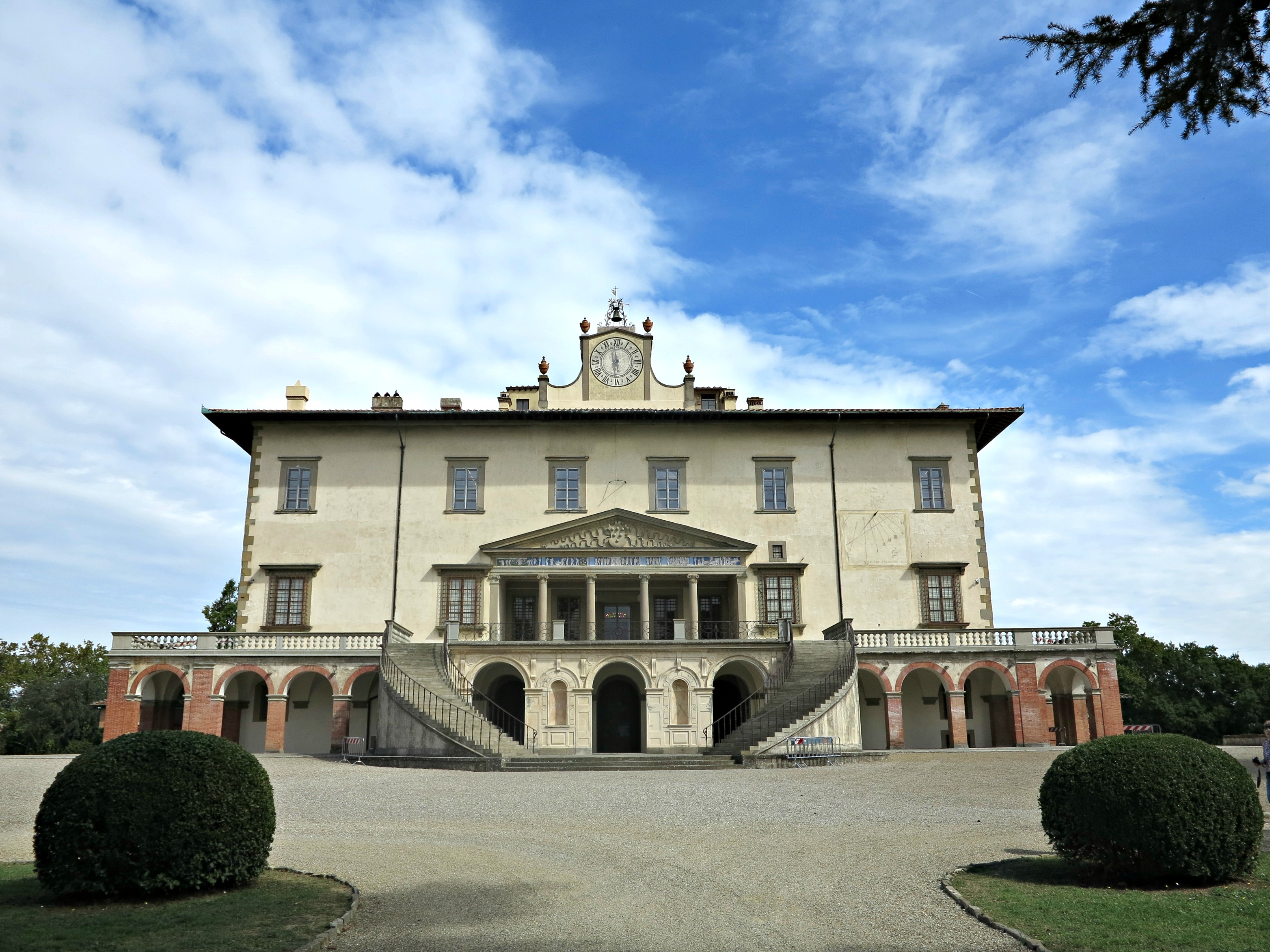
The Villa di Medici by Giuliano da Sangallo (1470), Poggio a Caiano, Tuscany, modernvillaco

=== Tuscany ===
In 14th and 15th century Italy, a villa once more connoted a country house, like the first Medici villas, the Villa del Trebbio and that at Cafaggiolo, both strong fortified houses built in the 14th century in the Mugello region near Florence. In 1450, Giovanni de' Medici commenced on a hillside the Villa Medici in Fiesole, Tuscany, probably the first villa created under the instructions of Leon Battista Alberti, who theorized the features of the new idea of villa in his De re aedificatoria.

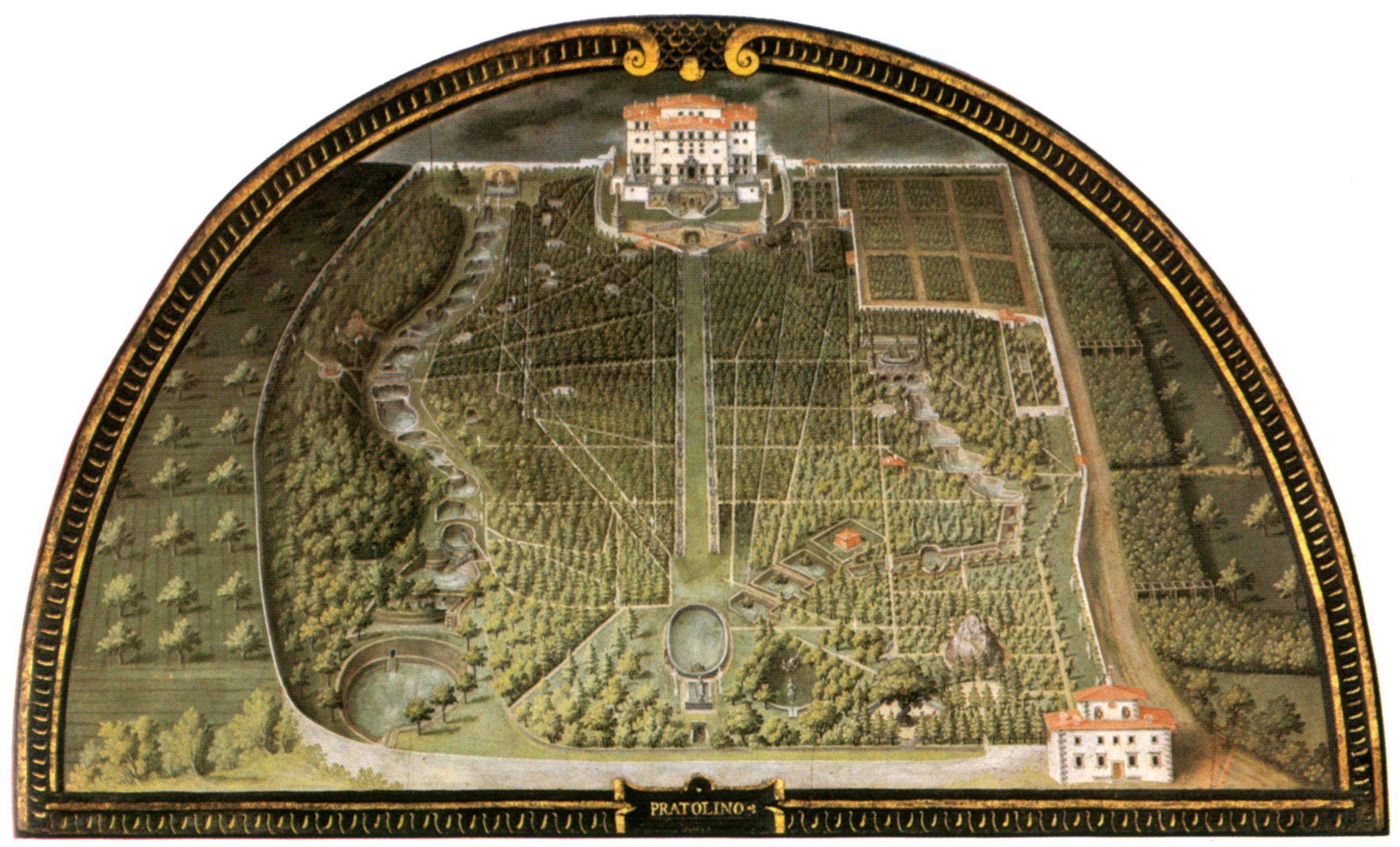
Villa di Pratolino with lower half of the gardens, by Giusto Utens. Museo Topografico, Florence.

These first examples of Renaissance villa predate the age of Lorenzo de' Medici, who added the Villa di Poggio a Caiano by Giuliano da Sangallo, begun in 1470, in Poggio a Caiano, Province of Prato, Tuscany. From Tuscany the idea of villa was spread again through Renaissance Italy and Europe.

==== Tuscan villa gardens ====
The Quattrocento villa gardens were treated as a fundamental and aesthetic link between a residential building and the outdoors, with views over a humanized agricultural landscape, at that time the only desirable aspect of nature. Later villas and gardens include the Palazzo Pitti and Boboli Gardens in Florence, and the Villa di Pratolino in Vaglia.

=== Rome ===
Rome had more than its share of villas with easy reach of the small sixteenth-century city: the progenitor, the first villa suburbana built since Antiquity, was the Belvedere or palazzetto, designed by Antonio del Pollaiuolo and built on the slope above the Vatican Palace. The Villa Madama, the design of which, attributed to Raphael and carried out by Giulio Romano in 1520, was one of the most influential private houses ever built; elements derived from Villa Madama appeared in villas through the 19th century. Villa Albani was built near the Porta Salaria. Others are the Villa Borghese; the Villa Doria Pamphili (1650); the Villa Giulia of Pope Julius III (1550), designed by Vignola. The Roman villas Villa Ludovisi and Villa Montalto, were destroyed during the late nineteenth century in the wake of the real estate bubble that took place in Rome after the seat of government of a united Italy was established at Rome. The cool hills of Frascati gained the Villa Aldobrandini (1592); the Villa Falconieri and the Villa Mondragone. The Villa d'Este near Tivoli is famous for the water play in its terraced gardens. The Villa Medici was on the edge of Rome, on the Pincian Hill, when it was built in 1540. Besides these designed for seasonal pleasure, usually located within easy distance of a city, other Italian villas were remade from a rocca or castello, as the family seat of power, such as Villa Caprarola for the Farnese. Near Siena in Tuscany, the Villa Cetinale was built by Cardinal Flavio Chigi. He employed Carlo Fontana, pupil of Gian Lorenzo Bernini to transform the villa and dramatic gardens in a Roman Baroque style by 1680. The Villa Lante garden is one of the most sublime creations of the Italian villa in the landscape, completed in the 17th century.

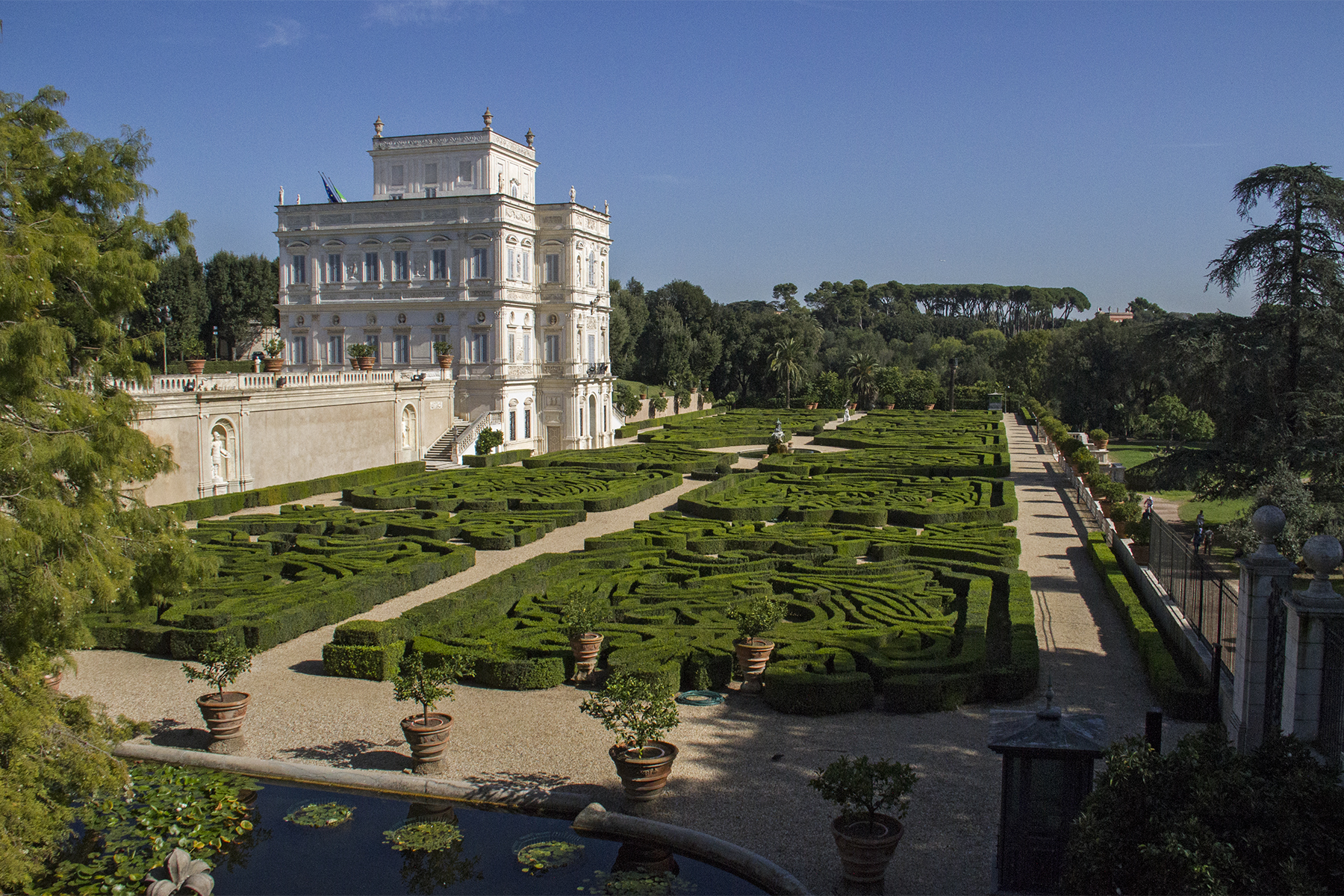
Villa Doria Pamphili, Rome

=== Venice ===
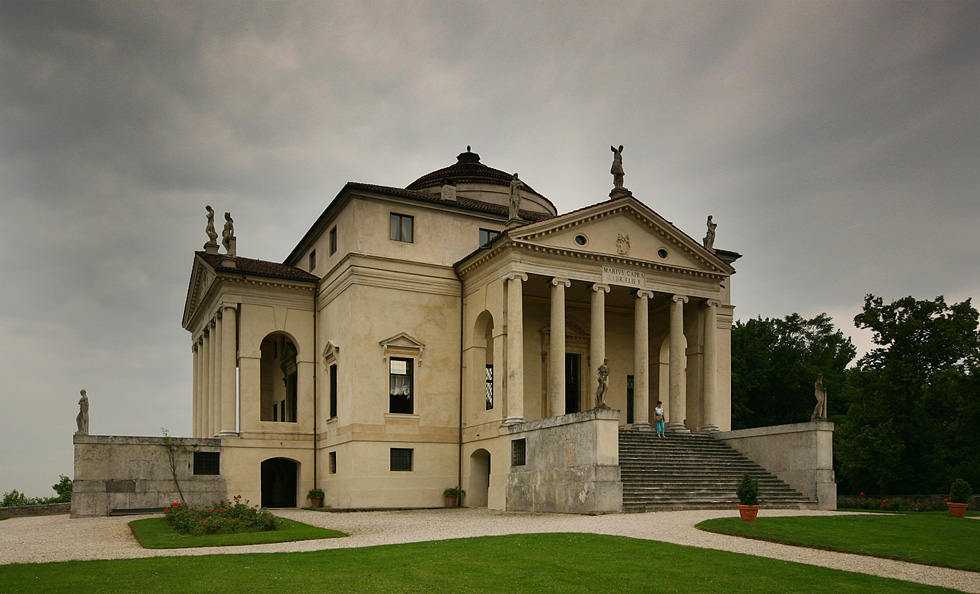
Villa Capra "La Rotonda" in Vicenza, one of Palladio's most influential designs

In the later 16th century in the northeastern Italian Peninsula the Palladian villas of the Veneto, designed by Andrea Palladio (1508–1580), were built in Vicenza in the Republic of Venice. Palladio always designed his villas with reference to their setting. He often unified all the farm buildings into the architecture of his extended villas while focusing on symmetry and perfect proportion. Examples are the Villa Emo, the Villa Godi, the Villa Forni Cerato, the Villa Capra "La Rotonda", and Villa Foscari. The Villas are grouped into an association (Associazione Ville Venete) and offer touristic itineraries and accommodation possibilities.

== Villas elsewhere ==
=== 17th century ===
Soon after in Greenwich England, following his 1613–1615 Grand Tour, Inigo Jones designed and built the Queen's House between 1615 and 1617 in an early Palladian architecture style adaptation in another country. The Palladian villa style renewed its influence in different countries and eras and remained influential for over four hundred years, with the Neo-Palladian a part of the late 17th century and on Renaissance Revival architecture period.

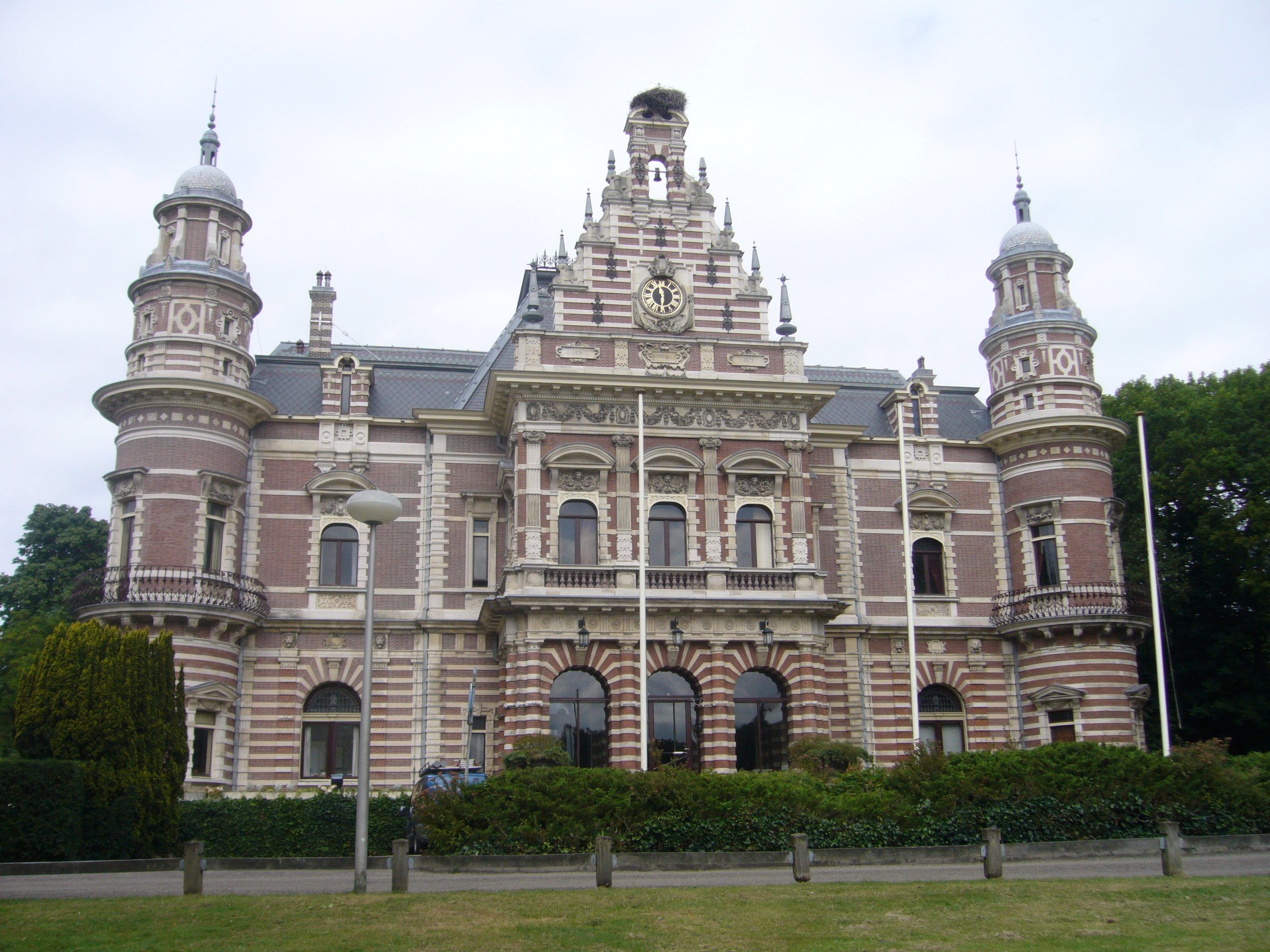
Oud-Wassenaar Castle is a nineteenth-century villa, a large country residence in Wassenaar, the Netherlands

=== 18th and 19th centuries ===
In the early 18th century the English took up the term, and applied it to compact houses in the country, especially those accessible from London: Chiswick House is an example of such a "party villa". Thanks to the revival of interest in Palladio and Inigo Jones, soon Neo-Palladian villas dotted the valley of the River Thames and English countryside. Marble Hill House in England was conceived originally as a "villa" in the 18th-century sense.

In many ways the late 18th century Monticello, by Thomas Jefferson in Virginia, United States is a Palladian Revival villa. Other examples of the period and style are Hammond-Harwood House in Annapolis, Maryland; and many pre-American Civil War or antebellum plantations, such as Westover Plantation and many other James River plantations as well dozens of Antebellum era plantations in the rest of the Old South functioned as the Roman Latifundium villas had. A later revival, in the Gilded Age and early 20th century, produced The Breakers in Newport, Rhode Island, Filoli in Woodside, California, and Dumbarton Oaks in Georgetown, Washington, D.C.; by architects-landscape architects such as Richard Morris Hunt, Willis Polk, and Beatrix Farrand.

In the nineteenth century, the term villa was extended to describe any large suburban house that was free-standing in a landscaped plot of ground. By the time 'semi-detached villas' were being erected at the turn of the twentieth century, the term collapsed under its extension and overuse.

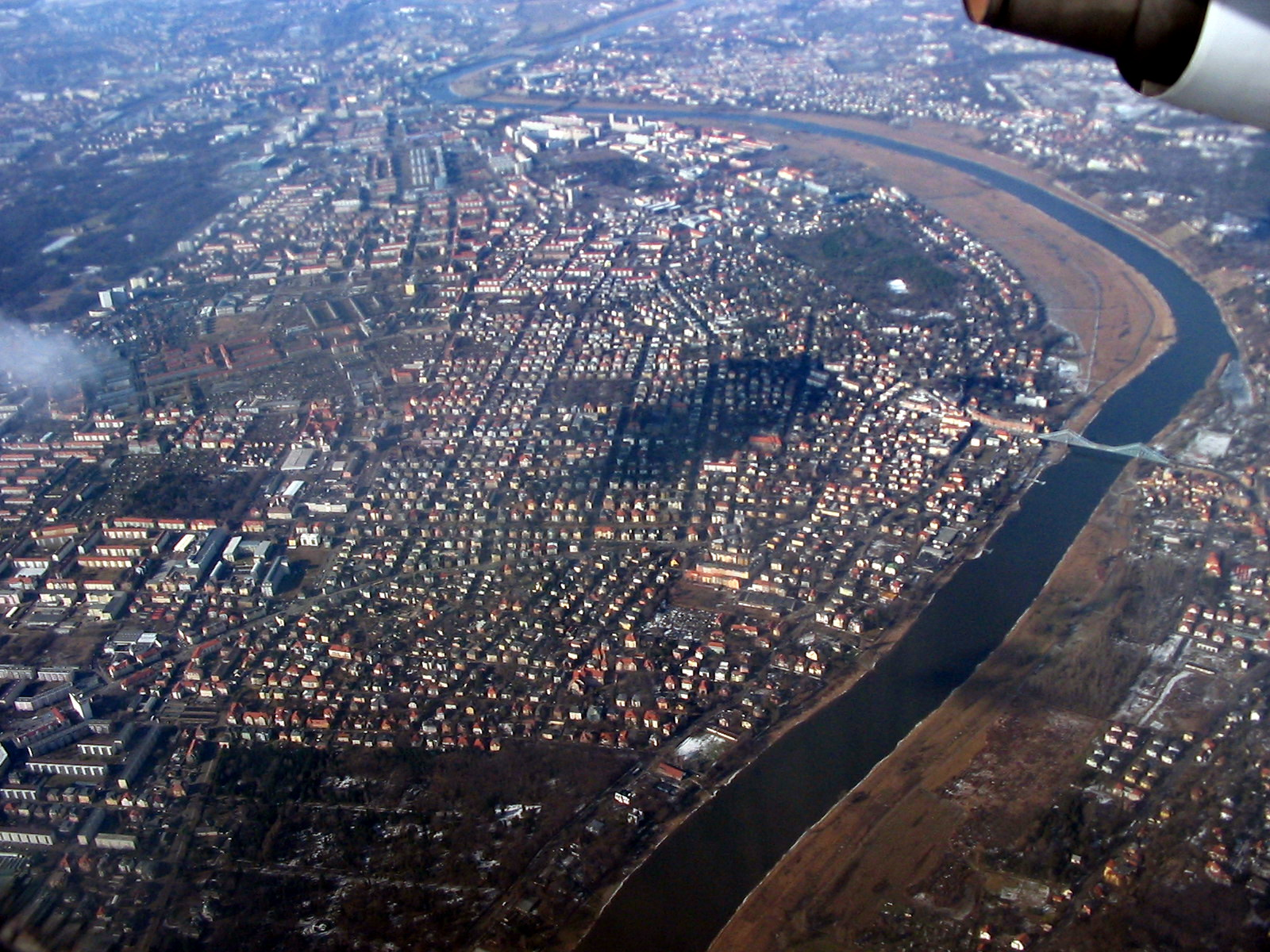
Aerial view of giant "villa colonies" (Villenkolonien) in Dresden, Germany: Gründerzeit quarters of Blasewitz (incl. Tolkewitz and Striesen), Gruna and Johannstadt.

The second half of the nineteenth century saw the creation of large "Villenkolonien" in the German speaking countries, wealthy residential areas that were completely made up of large mansion houses and often built to an artfully created masterplan. Many large mansions for the wealthy German industrialists were built as well, such as Villa Hügel in Essen. The Villenkolonie of Lichterfelde West in Berlin was conceived after an extended trip by the architect through the South of England. Representative historicist mansions in Germany include the Heiligendamm and other resort architecture mansions at the Baltic Sea, Rose Island and King's House on Schachen in the Bavarian Alps, Villa Dessauer in Bamberg, Villa Wahnfried in Bayreuth, Drachenburg near Bonn, Hammerschmidt Villa in Bonn, the Liebermann Villa and Britz House in Berlin, Albrechtsberg, Eckberg, Villa Stockhausen and Villa San Remo in Dresden, Villa Waldberta in Feldafing, Villa Kennedy in Frankfurt, Jenisch House and Budge-Palais in Hamburg, Villa Andreae and Villa Rothschild in Königstein, Villa Stuck and Pacelli-Palais in Munich, Schloss Klink at Lake Müritz, Villa Ludwigshöhe in Rhineland-Palatinate, Villa Haux in Stuttgart and Weinberg House in Waren.

In France the Château de Ferrières is an example of the Italian Neo-Renaissance style villa – and in Britain the Mentmore Towers. A representative building of this style in Germany is Villa Haas (designed by Ludwig Hofmann) in Hesse.

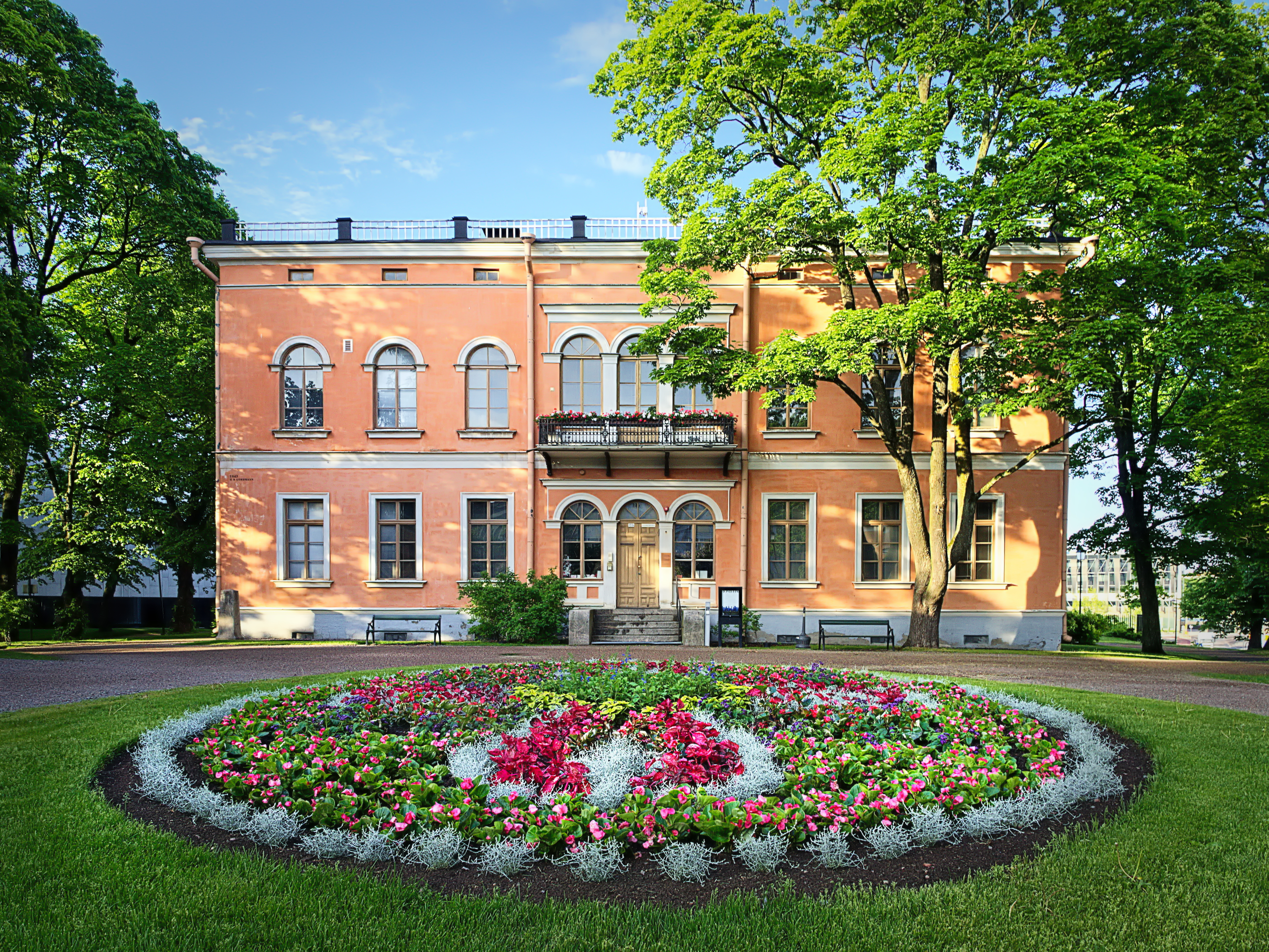
Villa Hakasalmi

Villa Hakasalmi in Helsinki (built in 1834–46) represents Empire-era villa architecture. It was the home of Aurora Karamzin (1808–1902) at the end of the 19th century and is now the city museum of Helsinki, Finland.

=== 20th – 21st centuries ===
==== Europe ====
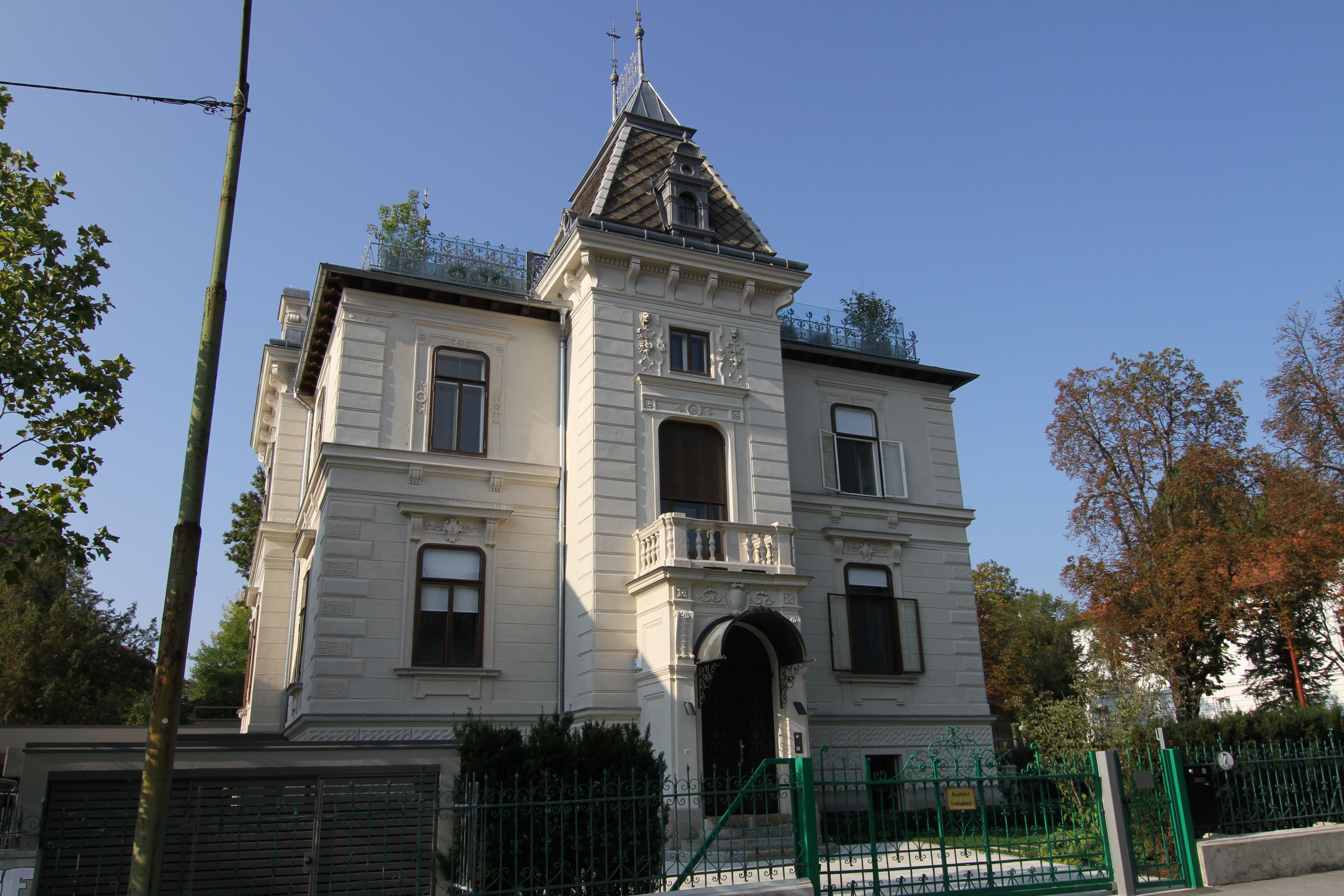
Typical villa in Graz, Austria

During the 19th and 20th century, the term "villa" became widespread for detached mansions in Europe. Special forms are for instance spa villas (Kurvillen in German) and seaside villas (Bädervillen in German), that became especially popular at the end of the 19th century. The tradition established back then continued throughout the 20th century and even until today. Another trend was the erection of rather minimalist mansions in the Bauhaus style since the 1920s, that also continues until today. In Denmark, Norway and Sweden "villa" denotes most forms of single-family detached homes, regardless of size and standard.

==== Americas ====
The villa concept lived and lives on in the haciendas of Latin America and the estancias of Brazil and Argentina. The oldest are original Portuguese and Spanish Colonial architecture; followed after independences in the Americas from Spain and Portugal, by the Spanish Colonial Revival style with regional variations. In the 20th century International Style villas were designed by Roberto Burle Marx, Oscar Niemeyer, Luis Barragán, and other architects developing a unique Euro-Latin synthesized aesthetic.

Villas are particularly well represented in California and the West Coast of the United States, where they were originally commissioned by well travelled "upper-class" patrons moving on from the Queen Anne style Victorian architecture and Beaux-Arts architecture. Communities such as Montecito, Pasadena, Bel Air, Beverly Hills, and San Marino in Southern California, and Atherton and Piedmont in the San Francisco Bay Area are a few examples of villa density.

The popularity of Mediterranean Revival architecture in its various iterations over the last century has been consistently used in that region and in Florida. Just a few of the notable early architects were Wallace Neff, Addison Mizner, Stanford White, and George Washington Smith. A few examples are the Harold Lloyd Estate in Beverly Hills, California, Medici scale Hearst Castle on the Central Coast of California, and Villa Montalvo in the Santa Cruz Mountains of Saratoga, California, Villa Vizcaya in Coconut Grove, Miami, American Craftsman versions are the Gamble House and the villas by Greene and Greene in Pasadena, California

==== Modern villas ====
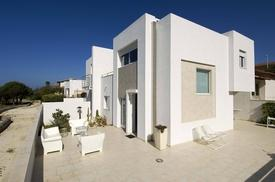
Example of Modern architecture villa in Sicily, Italy

The Getty Villa, an adaptation of the Villa of the Papyri, in Pacific Palisades, Los Angeles

Modern architecture has produced some important examples of buildings known as villas:

- Villa Noailles by Robert Mallet-Stevens in Hyères, France
- Villa Savoye by Le Corbusier in Poissy, France
- Villa Mairea by Alvar Aalto in Noormarkku, Finland
- Villa Tugendhat by Ludwig Mies van der Rohe in Brno, Czech Republic
- Villa Lewaro by Vertner Tandy in Irvington, New York

Country-villa examples:

- Hollyhock House (1919) by Frank Lloyd Wright in Hollywood
- Gropius House by Walter Gropius (1937) in Lincoln, Massachusetts
- Fallingwater by Frank Lloyd Wright (1939) in Pennsylvania, U.S.
- Farnsworth House by Ludwig Mies van der Rohe in Plano, Illinois
- Kaufmann Desert House by Richard Neutra (1946) in Palm Springs, California
- Auldbrass Plantation by Frank Lloyd Wright (1940–1951) in Beaufort County, South Carolina
- Palácio da Alvorada by Oscar Niemeyer (1958) in Brasília, Brazil
- Getty Villa, in Pacific Palisades, Los Angeles

==== Other ====
Today, the term "villa" is often applied to vacation rental properties. In the United Kingdom the term is used for high quality detached homes in warm destinations, particularly Florida and the Mediterranean. The term is also used in Pakistan, and in some of the Caribbean islands such as Jamaica, Saint Barthélemy, Saint Martin, Guadeloupe, British Virgin Islands, and others. It is similar for the coastal resort areas of Baja California Sur and mainland Mexico, and for hospitality industry destination resort "luxury bungalows" in various locations worldwide.

In Australia, "villas" or "villa units" are terms used to describe a type of townhouse complex which contains, possibly smaller attached or detached houses of up to 3–4 bedrooms that were built since the early 1980s.

In New Zealand, "villa" refers almost exclusively to Victorian and Edwardian wooden weatherboard houses mainly built between 1880 and 1914, characterised by high ceilings (often 3.7 m or 12 ft), sash windows, and a long entrance hall.

In South Korea, the term "villa" refers to small multi-household house with 4 floors or less.

In Cambodia, "villa" is used as a loanword in the local language of Khmer, and is generally used to describe any type of detached townhouse that features yard space. The term does not apply to any particular architectural style or size, the only features that distinguish a Khmer villa from another building are the yard space and being fully detached. The terms "twin-villa" and "mini-villa" have been coined meaning semi-detached and smaller versions respectively. Generally, these would be more luxurious and spacious houses than the more common row houses. The yard space would also typically feature some form of garden, trees or greenery. Generally, these would be properties in major cities, where there is more wealth and hence more luxurious houses.

== See also ==
- Dacha
- Estate
- Great house
- Manor house
- Mansion
- Ultimate bungalow
