= Eugen Hoffers =

Finnish photographer

Carl Eugen Hoffers (1832 Jēkabpils, Courland – 1893 Saint Petersburg) was a Finnish photographer. He was one of the most significant photographers of his era in Finland.

Hoffers founded a photo studio in the center of Helsinki in the early 1860s. He gained fame for his documentary and landscape paintings. Among other things, he described the preparations for Alexander II's visit to Helsinki in 1863, and from 1868 onwards, with the emperor's consent, he used the title of court photographer. In 1873 he moved his photographic studio to St. Petersburg, where he gained great notoriety for his work.

The panorama of the tower of St. Nicholas Church (later Helsinki Cathedral) from 1866, photographed by Hoffers, is the oldest panorama of Helsinki and one of the oldest Helsinki-themed photographs in general.

Several dozen photographs of Hoffers have been preserved in the archives of the Helsinki City Museum.
