= Hakasalmi =

Hakasalmi may refer to:

- Villa Hakasalmi, the historically important 19th-century villa located in the Etu-Töölö district of central Helsinki, Finland
- Hakasalmi Street (now Keskuskatu), a street in Kluuvi neighborhood of Helsinki, Finland
