= Lux Helsinki =

Annual light art event in Helsinki, Finland

- Genre: Light art event
- Frequency: Annually
- Location: Helsinki
- Country: Finland
- Inaugurated: 2009
- Organiser: City of Helsinki

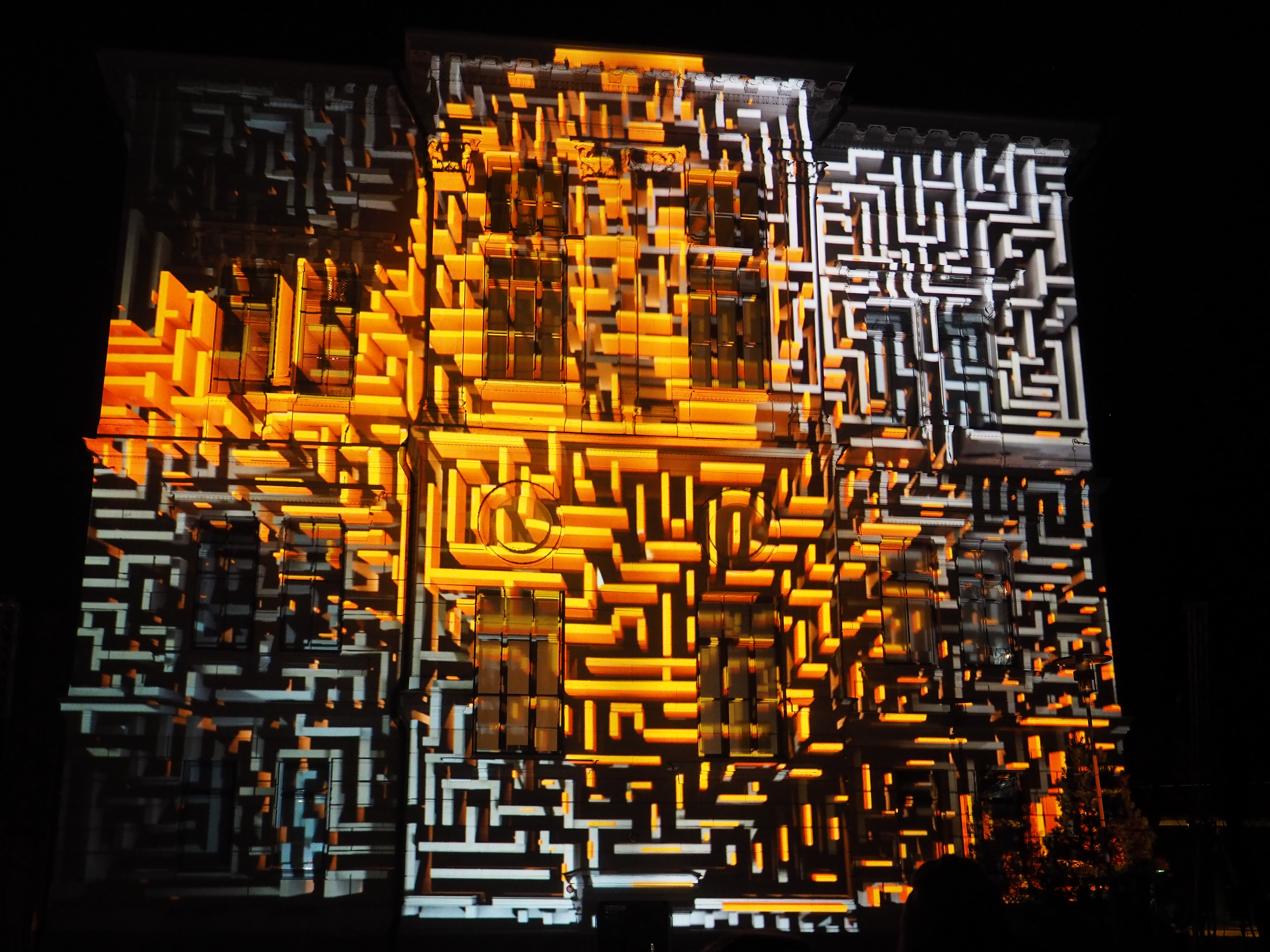
Light artwork at 2018 Lux Helsinki

Lux Helsinki is an annual light art event. It is arranged in the beginning of January in Helsinki, Finland. The event introduces a wide array of light artworks by both international and Finnish artists. The event is arranged by the City of Helsinki. The entry is free of charge. The Artistic Director of Lux Helsinki is Markku Uimonen, Professor in Lighting Design at the Helsinki Theatre Academy of the University of the Arts Helsinki. Lux Helsinki was held for the first time in 2009.

The 2021 Lux Helsinki event was cancelled because of the ongoing COVID-19 pandemic.

== 2014 ==
The sixth Lux Helsinki was arranged between 4 and 8 January 2014. Light installations were seen at 11 sites. An exhibition of light art Lux IN was held for the first time in Merikaapelihalli at the Cable Factory. 11 light installations were seen at the centre of Helsinki, 19 installations at the Cable Factory and almost 150 lanterns at the Lantern Park of the Hesperia Park. In addition to the Cable Factory and Hesperia Park, the event venues of 2014 were Senate Square, the New Student House, Kansalaistori, the Helsinki Music Centre, Villa Hakasalmi, the National Museum of Finland, the VR Warehouses and the National Opera Amphitheatre. The Lux Ratikka tram travelled along tracks in the centre already for the second time. The event gathered circa 150 000 visitors.

=== Corazón ===
The installation of the Senate Square was Corazón by the Spanish fashion designer Agatha Ruiz de la Prada in collaboration with the production and design company D-Facto. The installation consisted of a huge heart placed at the top of the steps of Helsinki Cathedral. Also the Cathedral backdrop, with its own lighting, merged into the installation. The installation was previously seen in the 2012 Fête des Lumières in Lyon, France.

=== Urban Flipper ===
The installation of the New Student House was Urban Flipper by the French company CT Light Concept, a giant pinball game at the facade of the building. One viewer at a time could operate the game onsite. The work was seen for the first time in the 2011 Fête des Lumières in Lyon, France.
