= Signe Brander =

Finnish photographer

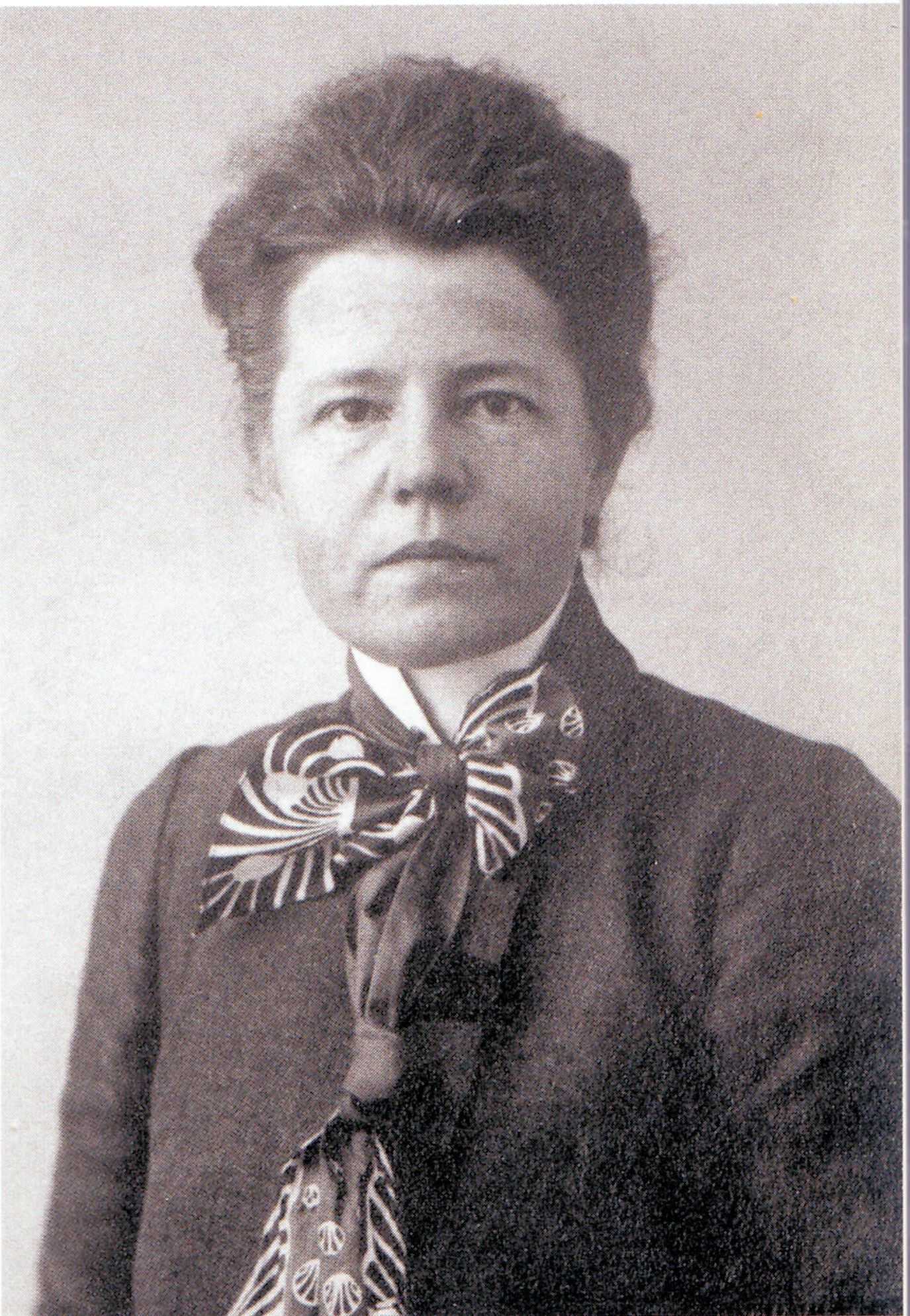
Signe Brander

Signe Viola Brander (15 April 1869 – 17 May 1942) was a Finnish photographer. She is best known for documenting the changing cityscapes of Helsinki and the everyday lives of the city's inhabitants in the early 20th century.

== Early life ==
Brander was born in Parkano and spent her childhood and youth in Kokkola. After her customs official father died in 1891, the family moved to Helsinki. There Brander took a course in the University of Art and Design to become a drawing teacher, but later focused on photography, working for instance in the studio of Daniel Nyblin.

== City photography ==
In 1906 the city of Helsinki founded an antiquities board. One of its duties was to document the changing city in photographs. The board hired Brander. Even though a woman photographer was not a rarity in the beginning of the 20th century, there were few working as city photographers.

The photographic documentary work started in 1907 and ended in 1913. The result was 907 photos of the changing cityscapes. The project was carefully planned and the city's planning and building authorities provided information to the antiquities board and Brander. However, she had a lot of freedom to express her artistic vision.

In the difficult and cramped urban environment the photographer had to have technical know-how, compositional skills and capacity for creative problem-solving. The weight of the photographic equipment also made the task physically challenging. Brander often hired a horse-drawn carriage to transport her equipment. On the most challenging shoots she apparently also had an assistant.

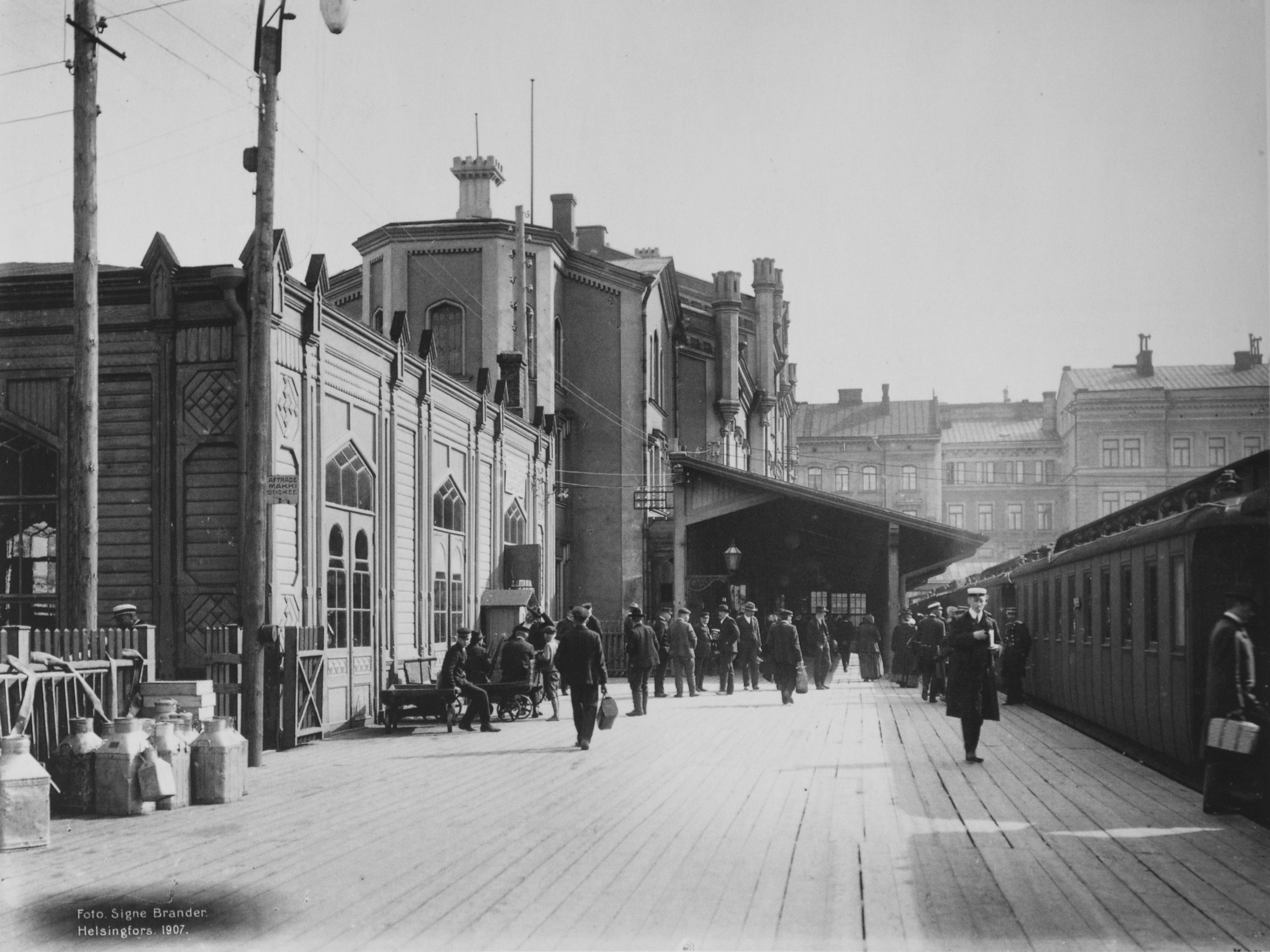
Helsinki's old railway station, 1907

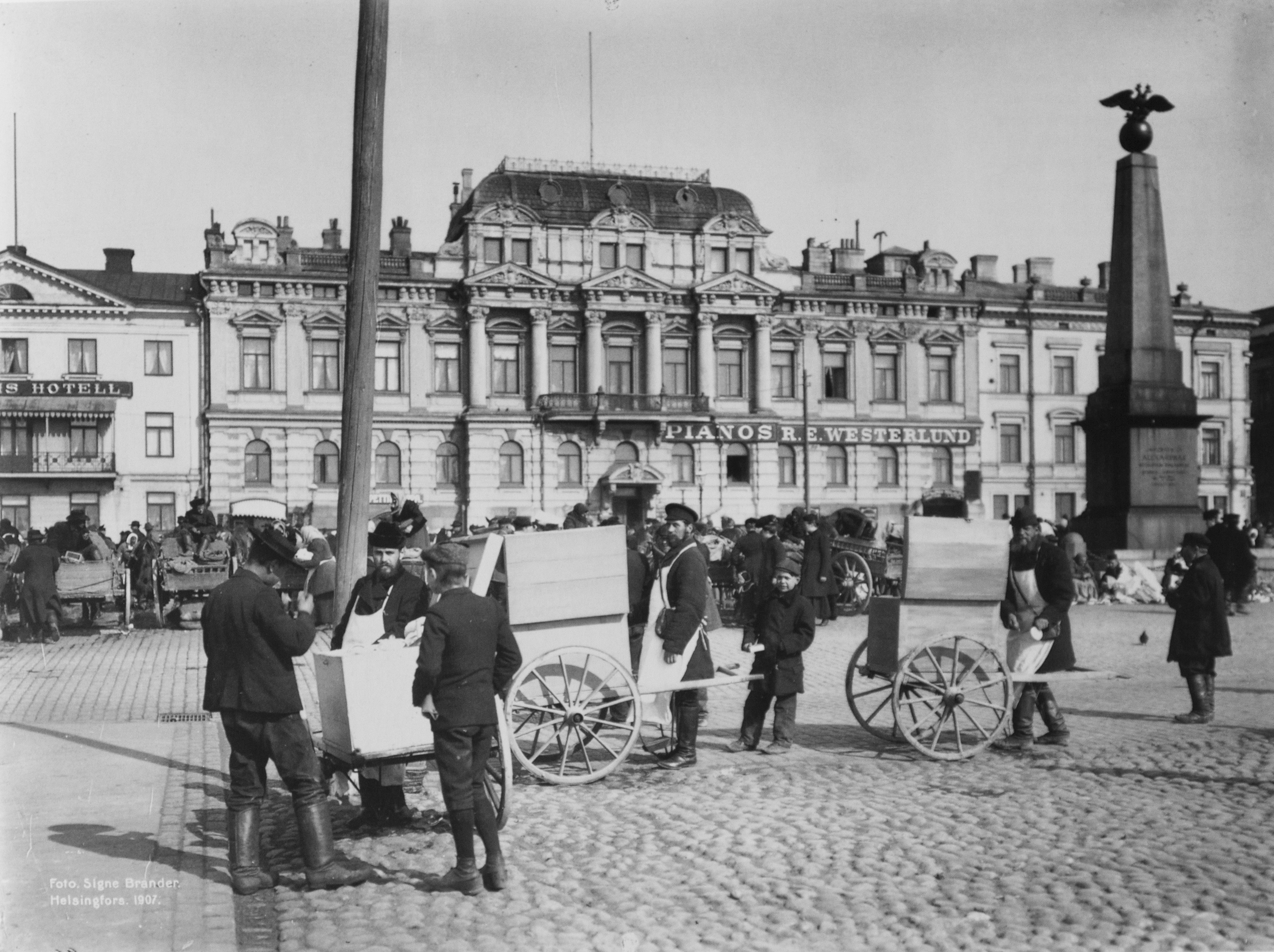
Market Square, 1907

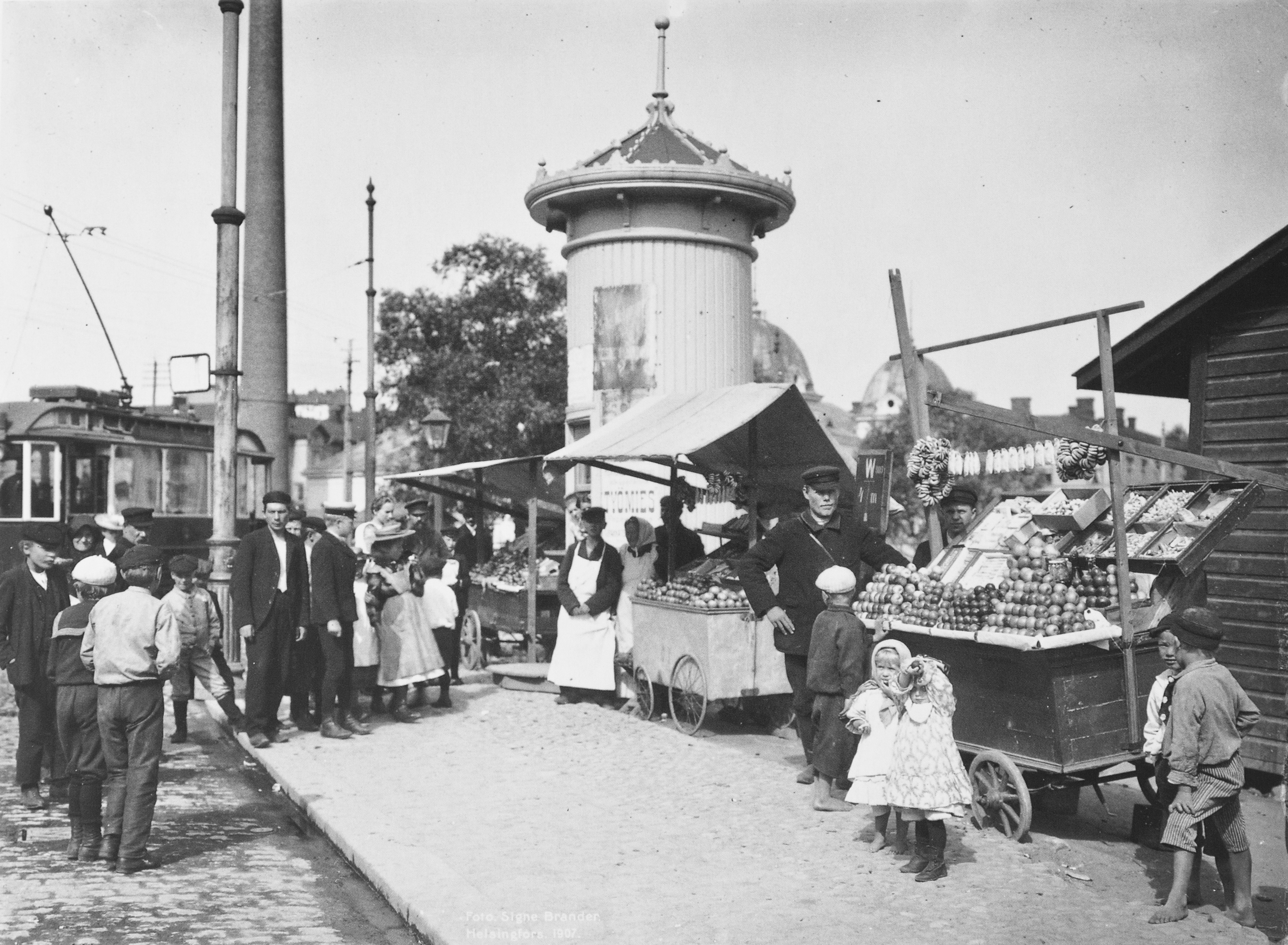
Hakaniemi square, 1907

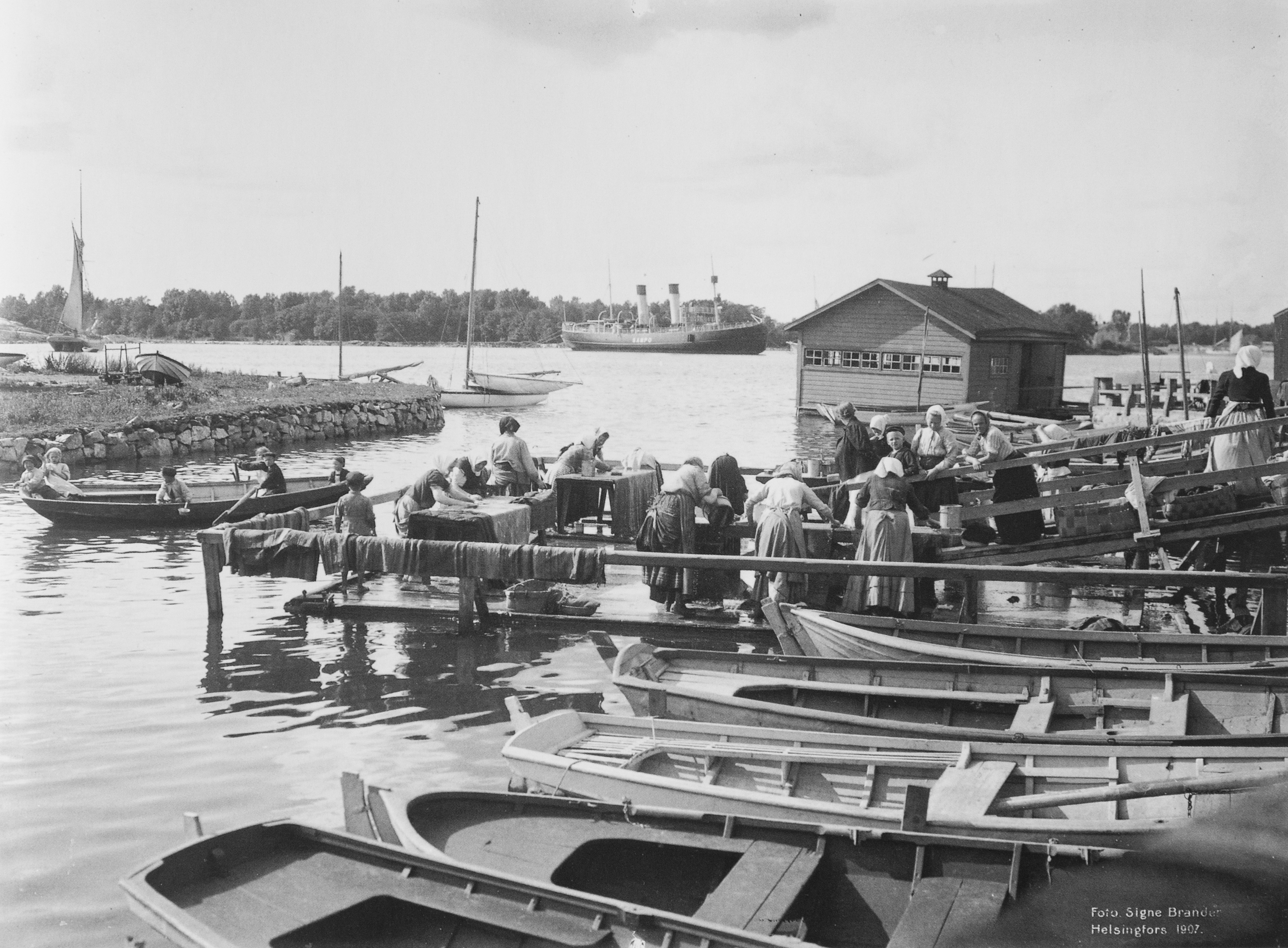
Munkkisaari, 1907

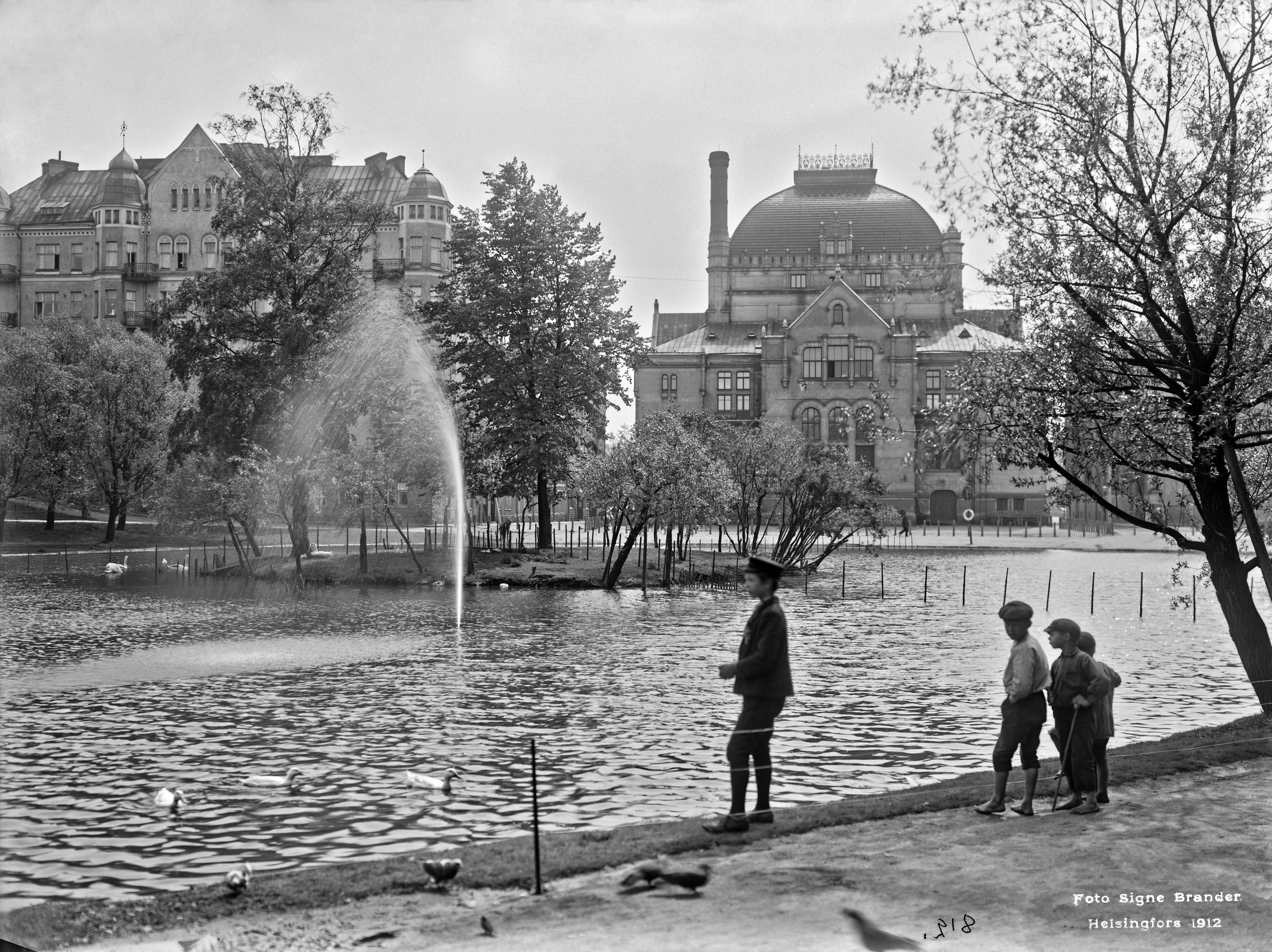
Kaisaniemi park, 1912

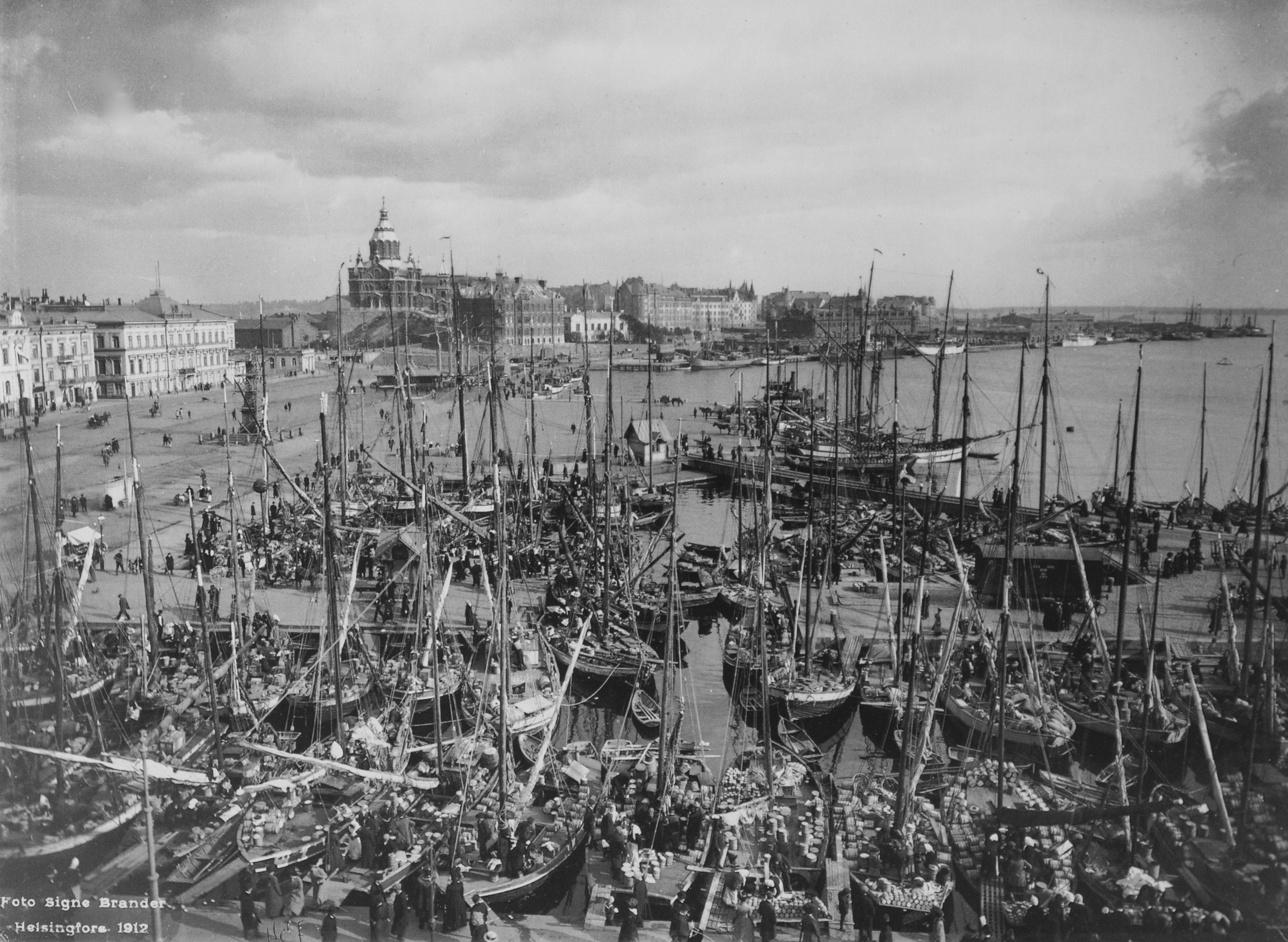
South Harbour, 1912

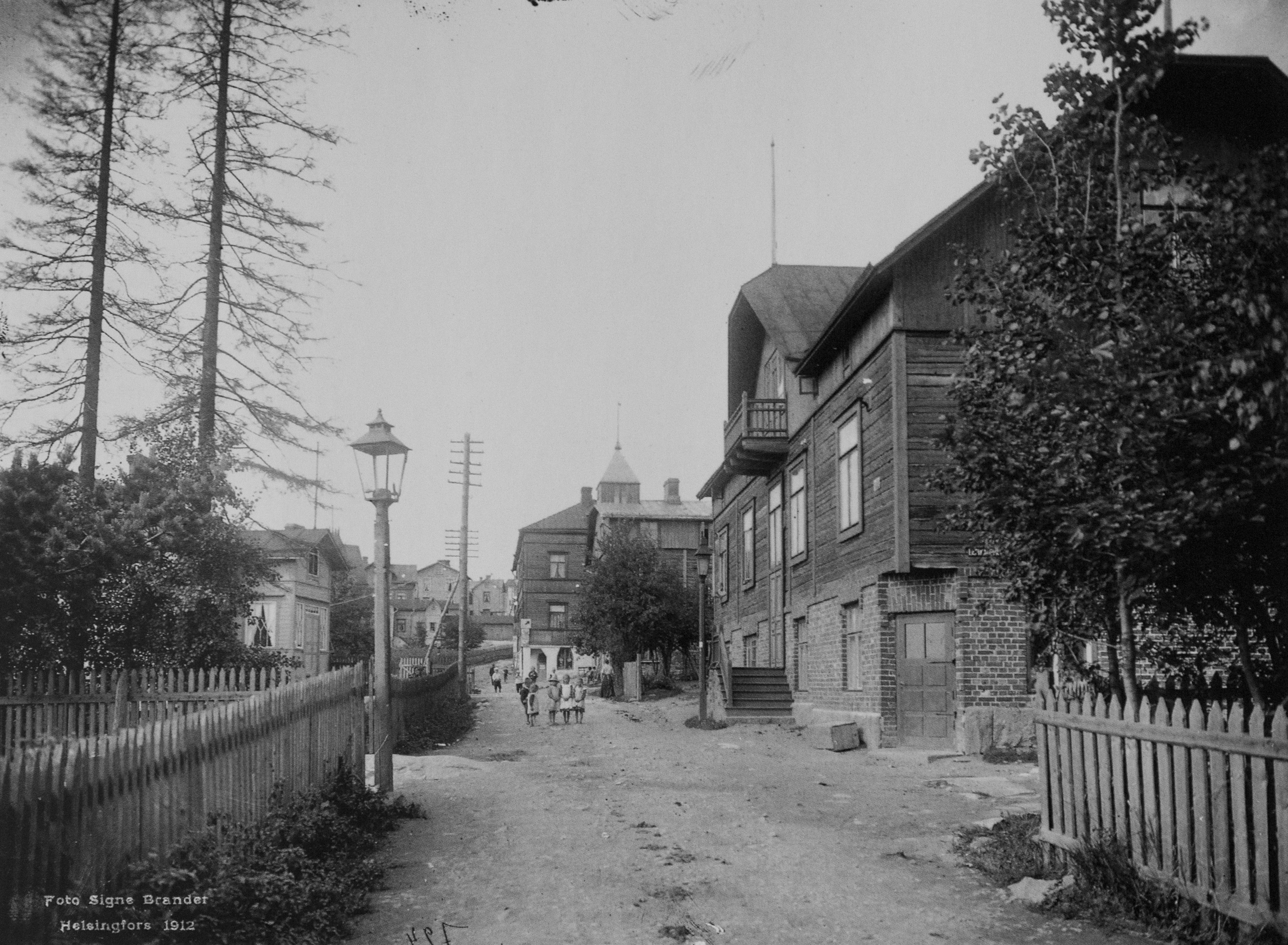
Hertankatu, 1912

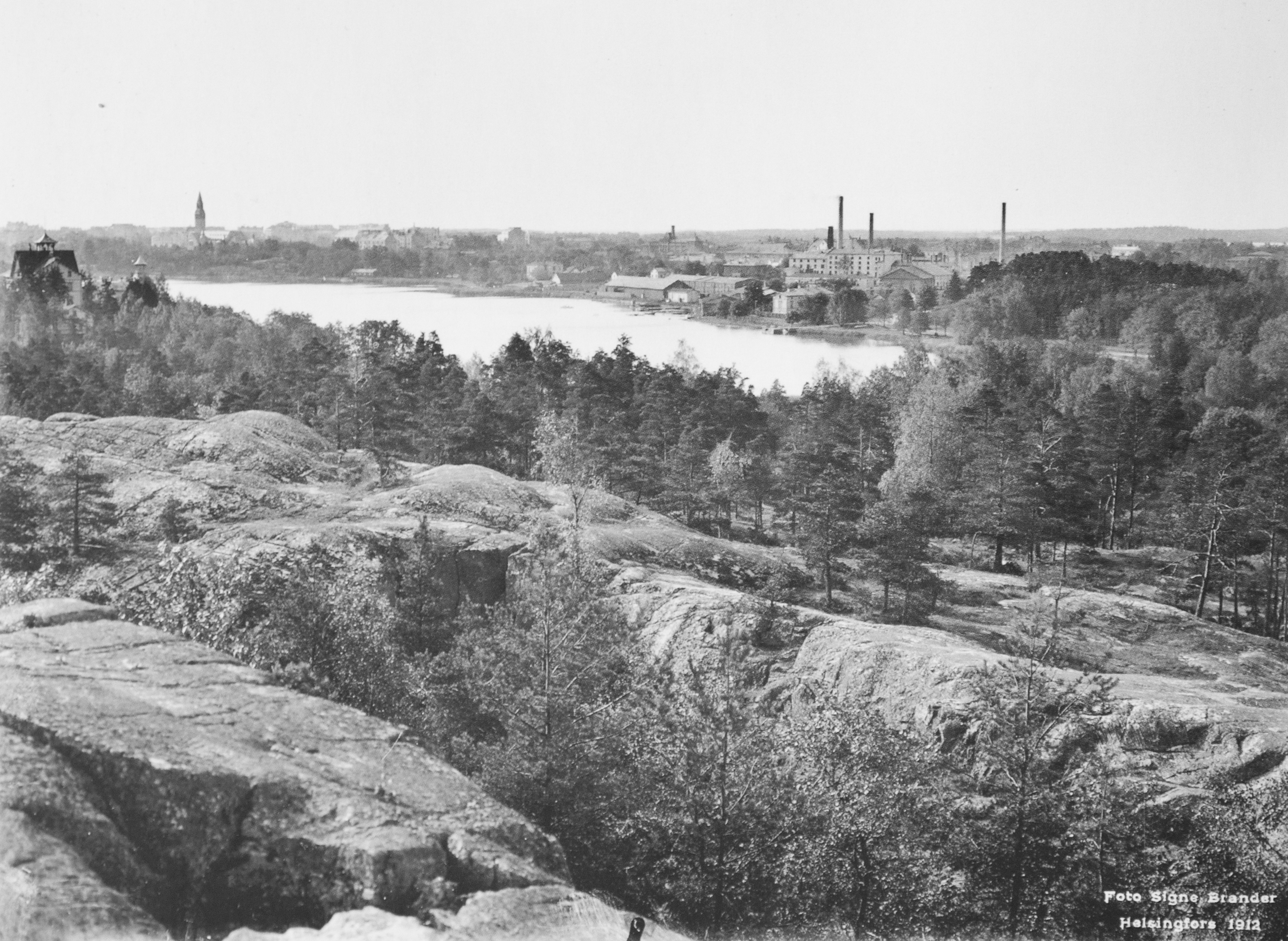
Töölönlahti Bay, 1912

== People, war memories and estates ==
In addition to her photography skills Brander also had artistic vision thanks to her drawing studies, and at their best her photos were almost visual art in their expression, composition and use of light. The central ideal of photographs at that time, however, was the sharpness and the detail of the photo, which made it possible to reproduce them correctly. Brander's photographs prominently feature people, everyday residents of Helsinki. They are continuously among the most popular in the Helsinki City Museum order catalog.

Brander also had other photography projects. In 1907 she toured Finland taking photos of old battlefields for the centenary memorial book of the Finnish War. In 1910 she started a project that would take 20 years, photographing Finnish estates; the project ended up generating over 2,000 photos. Some of these photos were published in the book Herrgårdar i Finland (1928–1929).

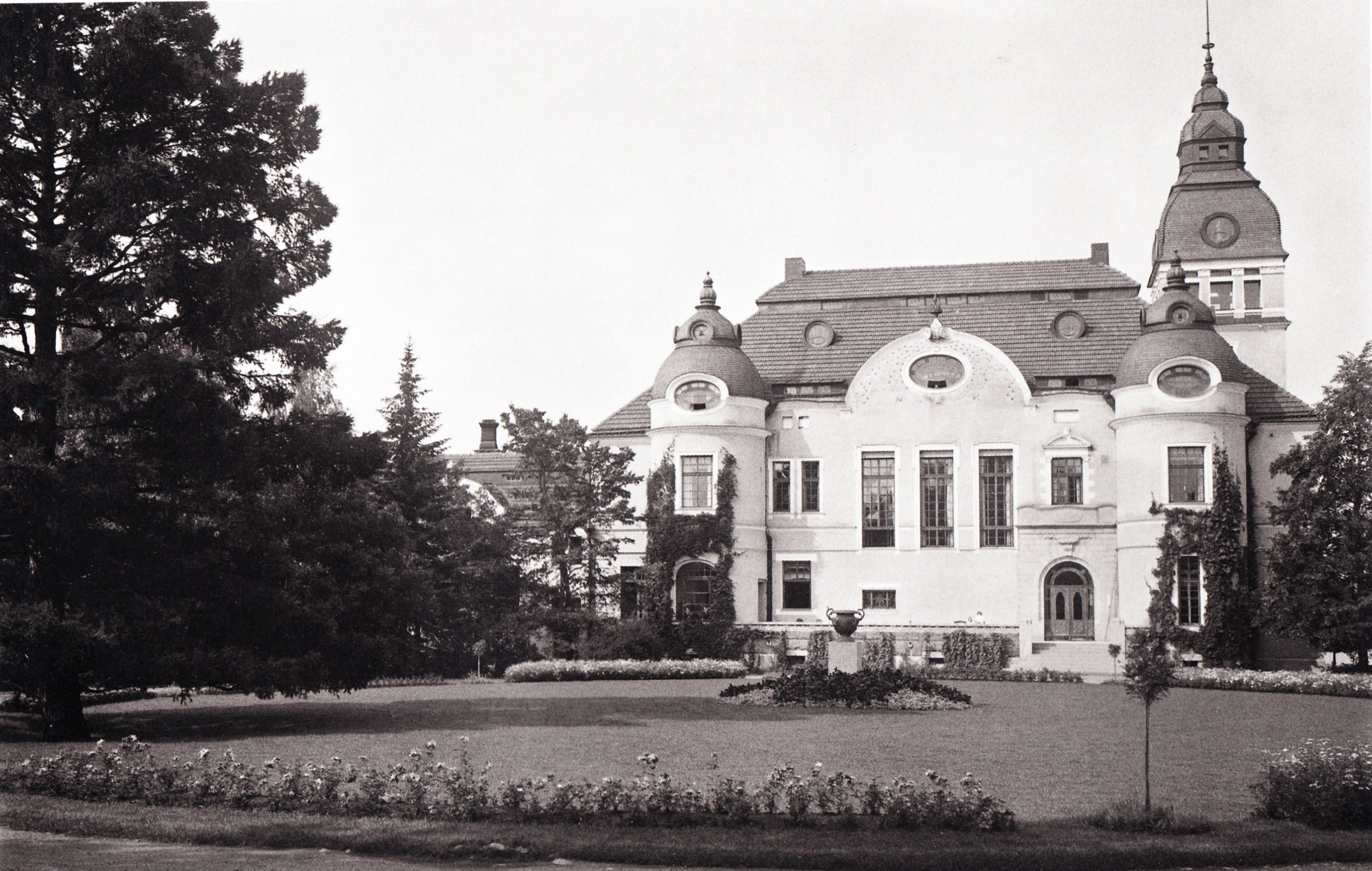
Kirjola estate, 1912

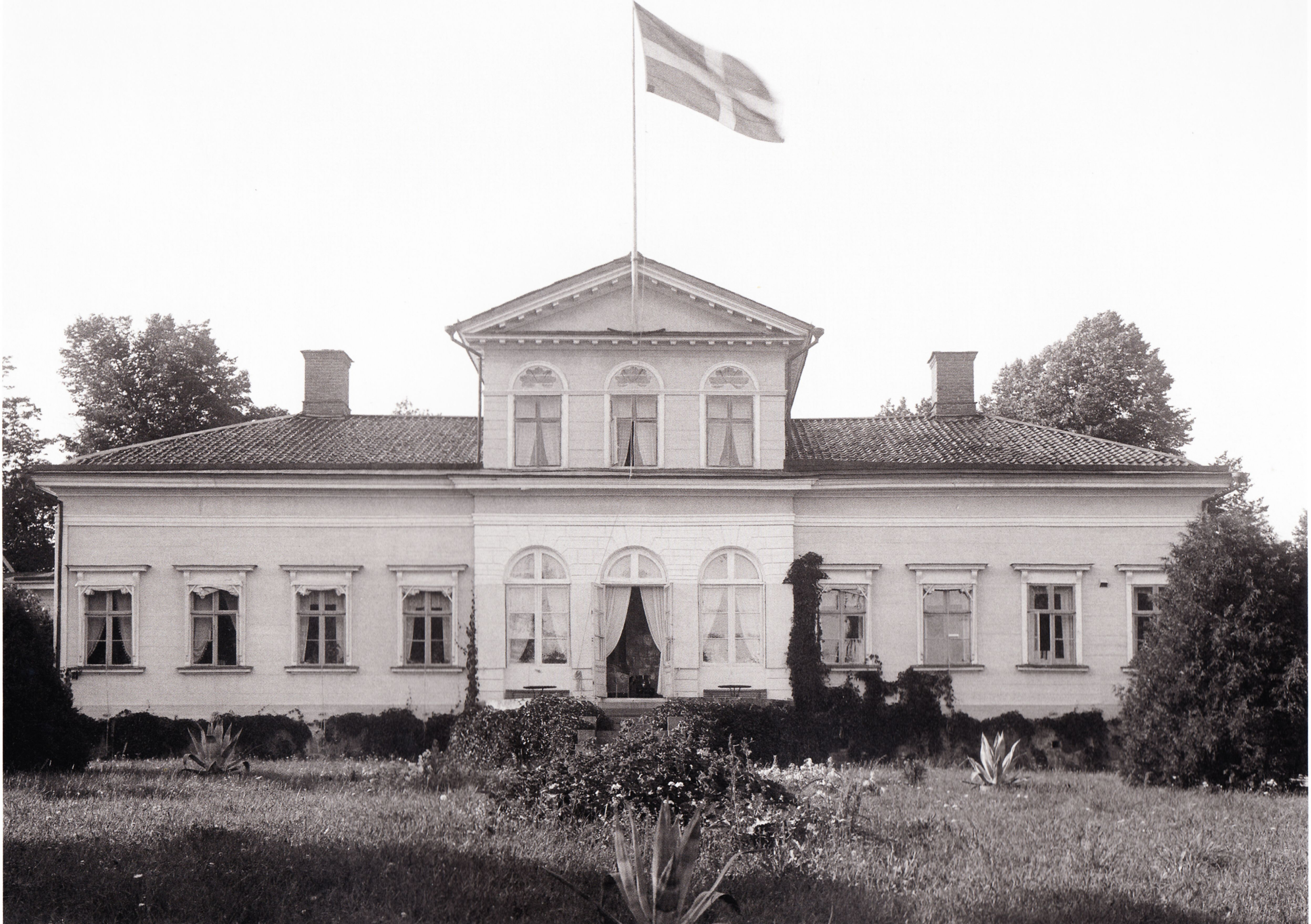
Artukainen estate, before 1917

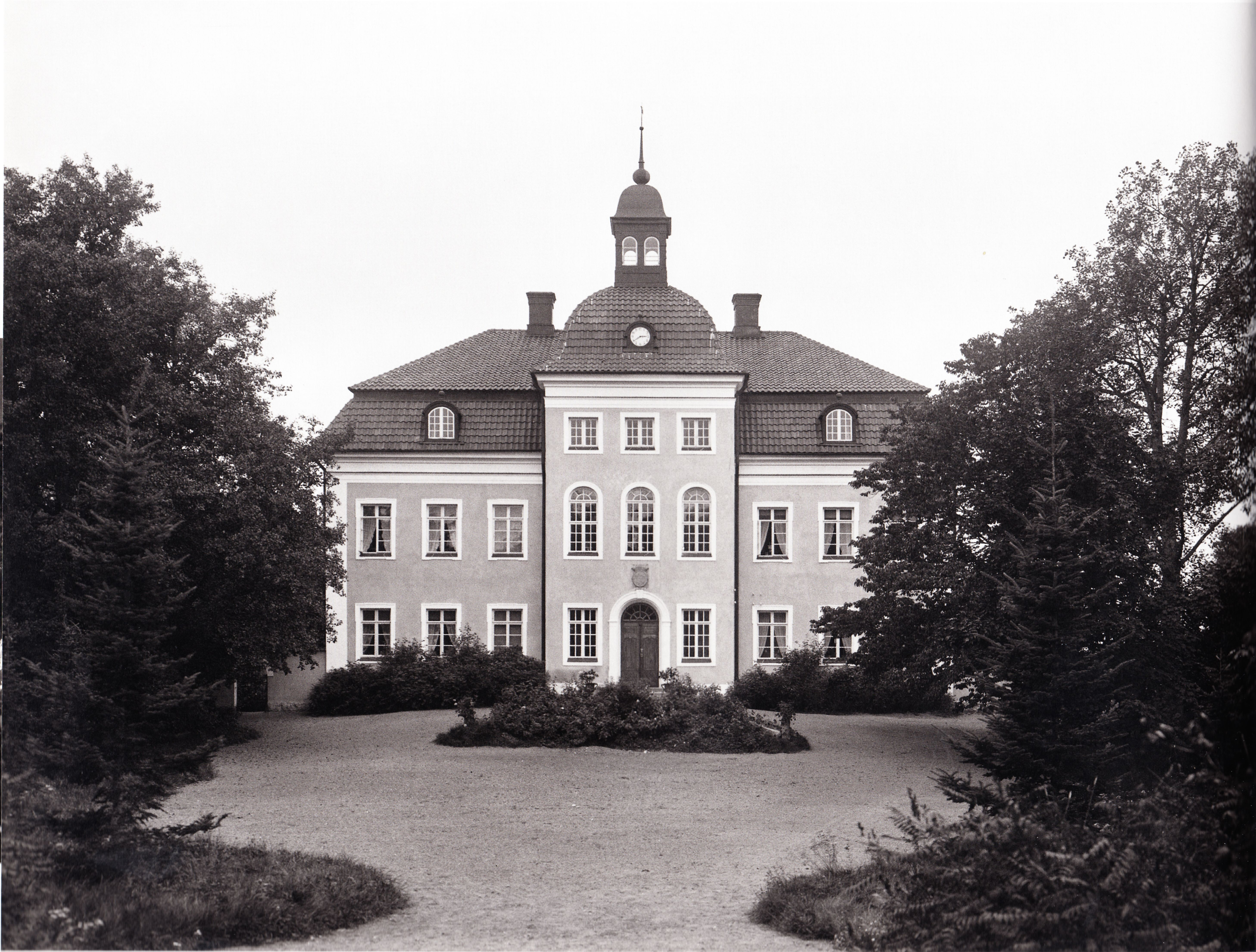
Tenhola estate, before 1920

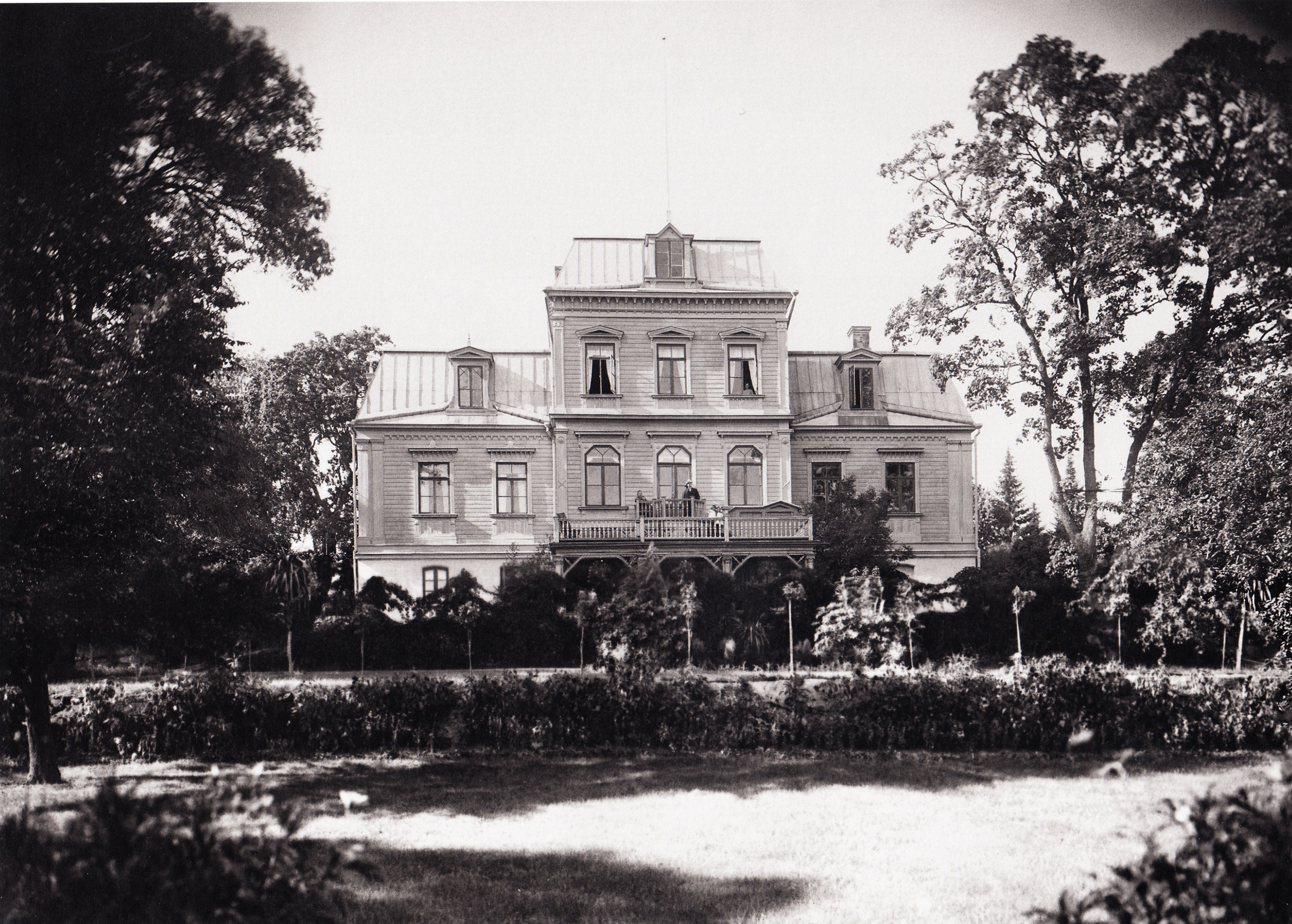
Östersundom estate, before 1920

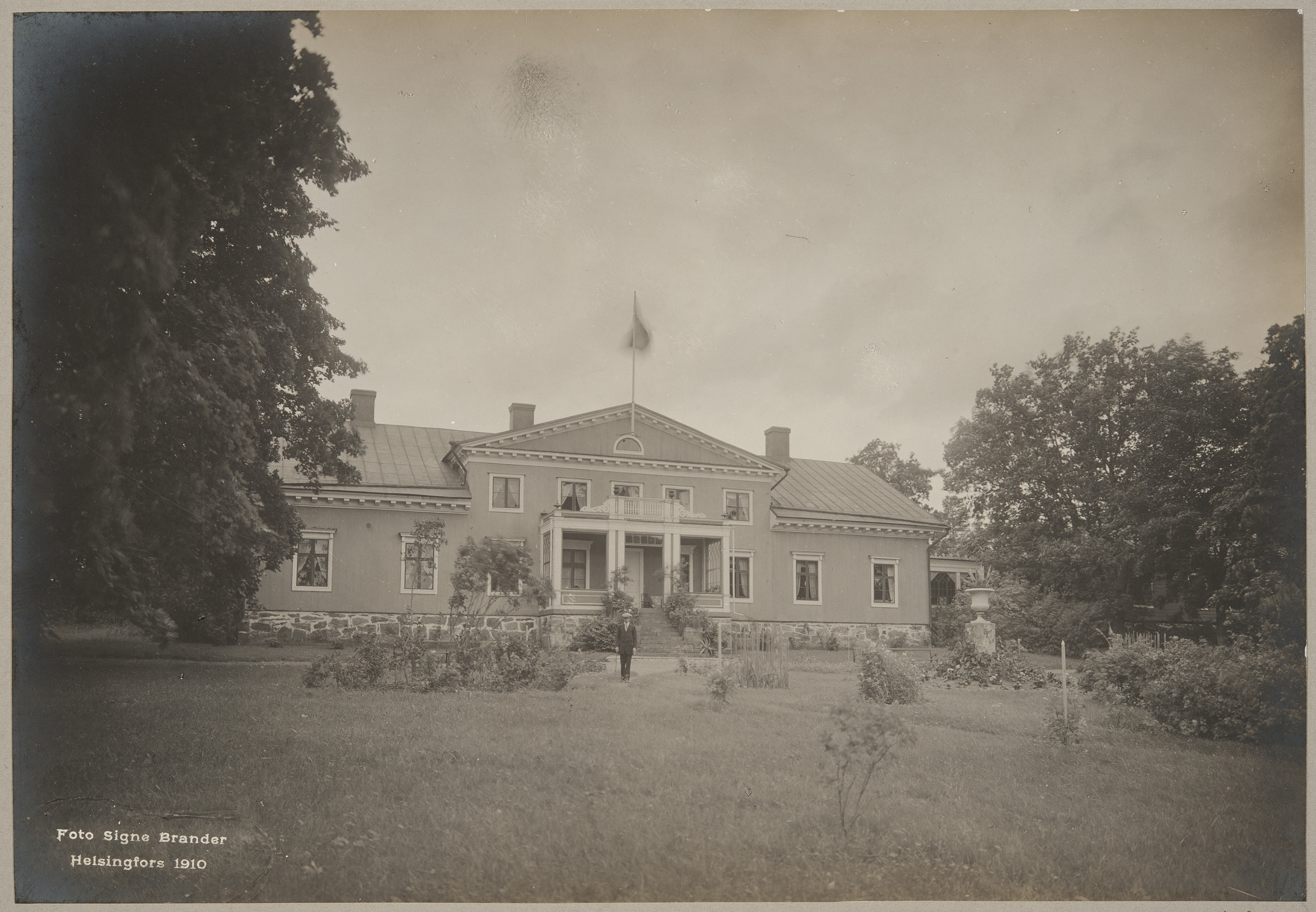
Riilahti estate, 1910.

== Personal life and death ==
Brander never married. She died in Sipoo in 1942.
