= Helsinki City Museum =

Museum in Helsinki, Finland

Coordinates: 60°10′08″N 024°57′15″E

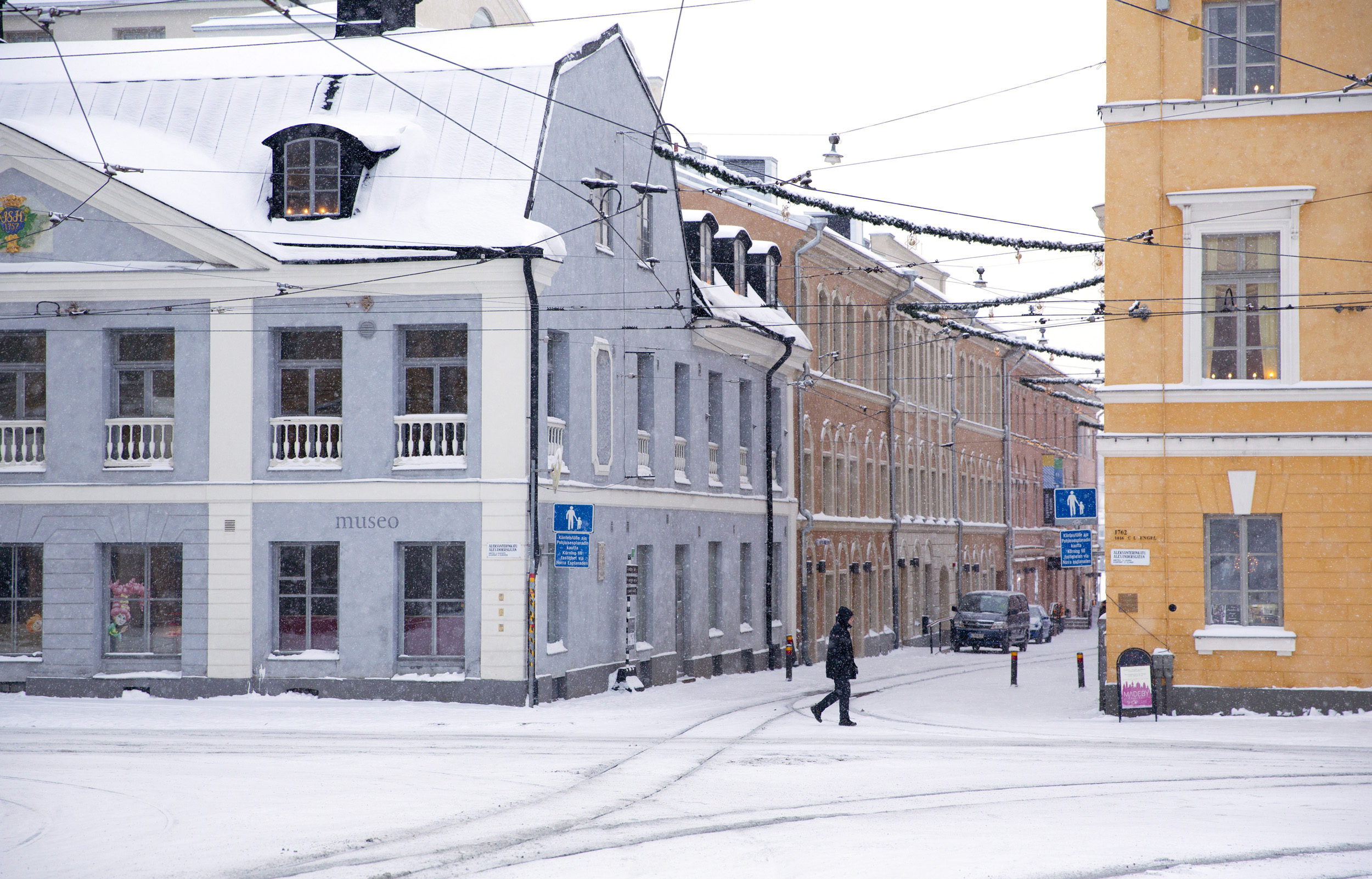
Helsinki City Museum

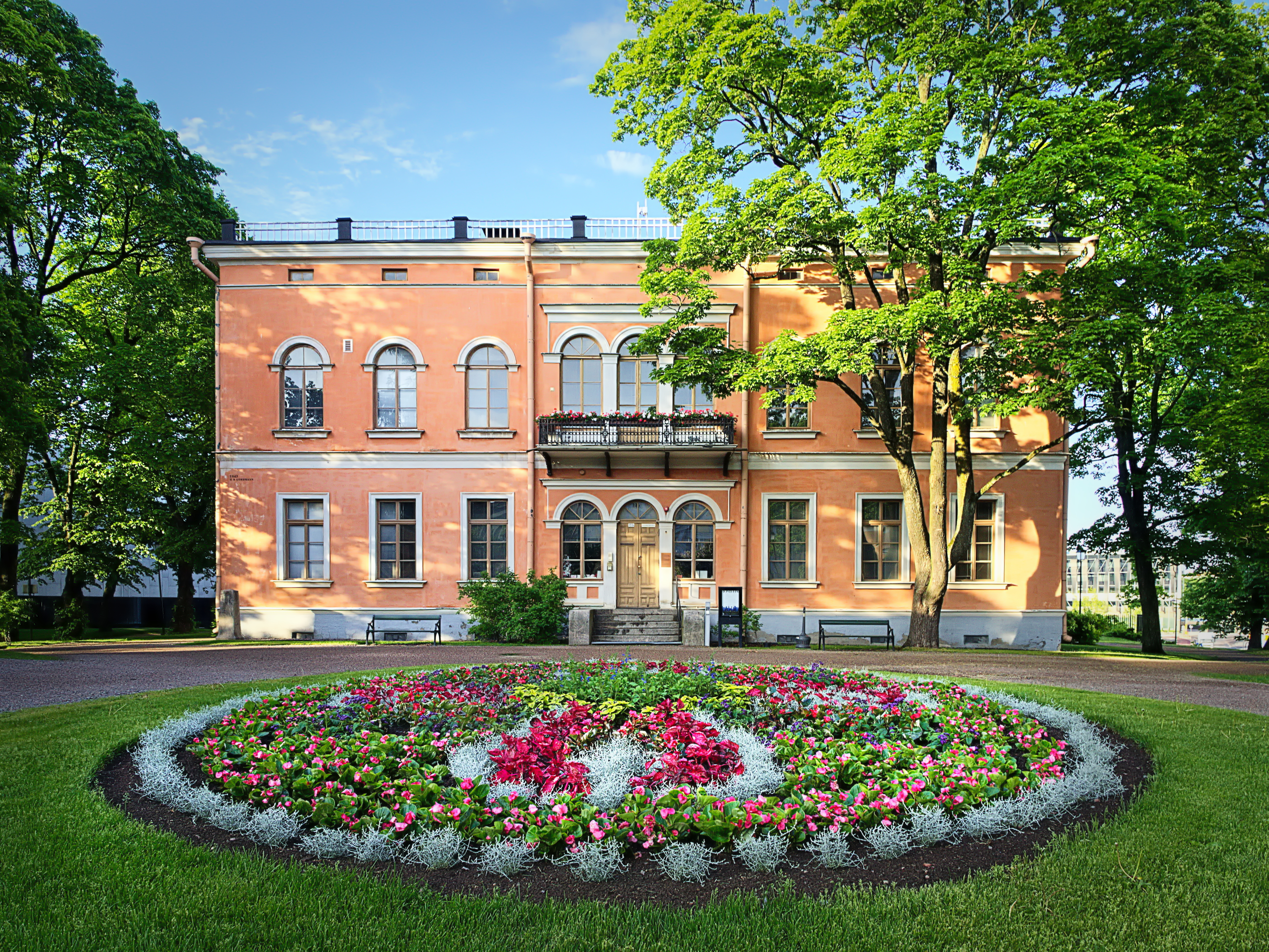
Villa Hakasalmi.

Helsinki City Museum (Finnish: Helsingin kaupunginmuseo, Swedish: Helsingfors stadsmuseum) is a museum in Helsinki that documents and displays the history of Helsinki, the capital of Finland.

Its mission is to record and uphold Helsinki's spiritual, material and architectural heritage. The museum features personal memories and everyday life of the city's residents.

The Helsinki City Museum won the Finnish Museum of the Year award in 2017.

In 2025, it was the second most visited museum in the entire country, attracting 330,312 visits.

It also acts as the regional museum for central Uusimaa with a mission to promote and steer museum activities in the region.

Helsinki City Museum is located next to the Senate Square in the oldest blocks of the city. One of the buildings is the Sederholm House. It also operates four other museums around Helsinki: Villa Hakasalmi, Burgher's House, Worker Housing Museum and Tram Museum. Entrance to all museums is free of charge.

The museum's collections contain about one million photos, for instance popular photos of early 20th century Helsinki by Signe Brander, and 450,000 items.

== See also ==
- Sederholm House
- Senate Square
- Market Square
- Esplanadi
- National Museum of Finland
