= Vila Real (disambiguation) =

Vila Real is a city and municipality in northern Portugal.

Vila Real may also refer to:

== Places ==
=== Portugal ===
- S.C. Vila Real, a football club from Vila Real
- Vila Real District, with capital Vila Real
- Vila Real de Santo António, a town in Faro District, Algarve region
  - Vila Real de Santo António (parish)

=== Spain ===
- Villarreal, Badajoz (Vila Real in Portuguese)
- Vila-real (Vila-real in Catalan), in Castellón, Valencian Community

=== Brazil ===
- Vila Real da Praia Grande, colonial designation of the city of Niterói, in Rio de Janeiro

== Other ==
- Vila Real Football Association, in Portugal

== See also ==
- Villarreal (disambiguation)
- Villa Real, Buenos Aires, current neighbourhood in Argentina
- Villa Real, Chetumal, former town in New Spain
