= David Villarreal =

American serial killer (born 1955)

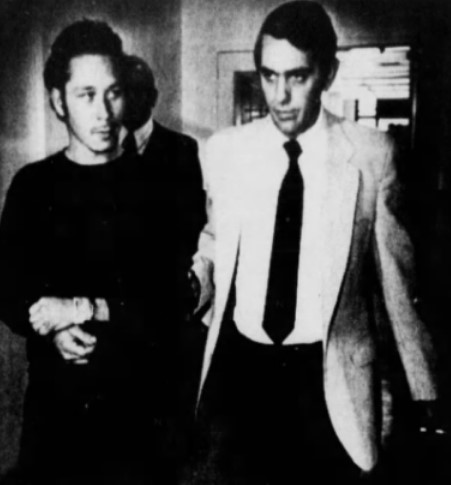
- Villarreal (left) being escorted by detective G.R. Robinson (right) in 1981
- Born: October 12, 1955 (age 71); San Antonio, Texas, U.S.
- Convictions: Murder (5 counts); Aggravated assault; Burglary
- Penalty: Life imprisonment (5 sentences)

Details
- Victims: 5–7
- Span of crimes: 1978 – 1981 (confirmed); 1974 – 1981 (suspected)
- Country: United States
- State: Texas
- Date apprehended: March 10, 1981
- Imprisoned at: James V. Allred Unit, Wichita Falls, Texas

David Villarreal (born October 12, 1955) is an American serial killer who tortured and killed at least five gay men in San Antonio and Dallas, Texas, from 1978 to 1981. Additionally suspected in two other murders committed in similar fashion, Villarreal was convicted of his confirmed killings in two trials and was given multiple life sentences.

== Murders ==
Villarreal's earliest confirmed murder dates back to either late 1978 or early 1979, when he bludgeoned to death 71-year-old Robert Johnson Manley II (Death certificate lists Robert Joseph, and the murder in early March 1981) at his apartment in San Antonio using a claw hammer. Manley, described as an "eccentric" individual without a job, was found dead in his bedroom by neighbors, clad only in his trousers. The bloodied murder weapon was left next to the body, but no suspect was identified at the time.

On March 17, 1979, the body of 26-year-old Ernesto Carbajal Garcia was found in an abandoned building in downtown Dallas, his skull having been crushed in with a concrete block. In addition to this, an autopsy established that he had likely been tortured before his eventual death, as Villarreal had struck him with a piece of wood on the head and stabbed him with an ice pick. A little over a month later, on April 18, Villarreal got into an apartment shared by 32-year-old Tony Natal Gutierrez and 30-year-old Charles Edward Moya, both of whom he wanted to kill because he "didn't like them". He first attacked Gutierrez, who was in the main room, by stabbing him in the chest with a knife before slashing his throat, then moved to the hallway, where he caught Moya and slashed his throat as well.

Villarreal then proceeded to disfigure both of his victims' faces, shoving a teaspoon up Gutierrez's nose and stabbing him near both eyes before covering his head with a pillow. He then moved to Moya's corpse, burning his right eyelid with a small wooden match. Shortly after these murders, Villarreal was detained for questioning in the Garcia murder, but was released due to a lack of evidence. While investigators were examining these killings and looking for suspects, he was imprisoned on a burglary charge in Austin and remained behind bars for almost two years.

After his release, Villarreal moved back to San Antonio, where he would commit his final known murder. On March 3, 1981, he met up with 18-year-old Joe Edward Duque at a city park, where he proceeded to bludgeon him to death with a cedar post. He then quickly left the area, leaving behind the murder weapon at the crime scene.

== Arrest, trials, and imprisonment ==
Already considered a strong suspect due to the fact that he was acquainted with all the known victims, authorities in Dallas moved in to arrest Villarreal once they received information that he was in their area. He was arrested without incident on March 10 and lodged in the county jail, but much to the shock of investigators, he voluntarily admitted that he was responsible for killing seven men since 1974. At first, investigators were only able to conclusively link him to the murders of Garcia, Gutierrez and Moya, but refrained from pressing murder charges until they could identify his other supposed victims. While he refused to divulge his motive for the crimes, detectives believed that it was partially out of personal animosity and Villarreal's own sexual gratification.

Eventually, investigators in San Antonio managed to link Villarreal to the Manley and Duque murders, announcing that they would file murder charges in both cases. It was first decided that Villarreal should be tried for the three murders in Dallas, as he was already detained at the local county jail on $90,000 bail. While awaiting trial, Villarreal gave an interview to a local TV station in which he claimed that he wanted to be executed as he could not bear the thought of spending the rest of his life behind bars, did not feel any remorse for his crimes, and that his brutality was to ensure that his victims were really dead.

Contrary to his previous claims, when brought before trial, Villarreal opted to plead guilty and was given three life terms for each murder. When transported to San Antonio to face the charges there, he again pleaded guilty and was given two additional life terms for the murders of Manley and Duque. As of January 2023, he remains imprisoned at the James V. Allred Unit in Wichita Falls. The identity of his two other victims, if they were real, remain unknown.

== See also ==
- List of serial killers in the United States
