= Óscar Villarreal =

Óscar Villarreal may refer to:

- Óscar Villarreal (baseball) (born 1981), Mexican baseball player
- Óscar Villarreal (footballer) (born 1981), Colombian footballer
- Óscar Espinosa Villarreal, Mayor of Mexico City from 1994 to 1997
