= Villa Hakasalmi =

Historically building in Helsinki, Finland

- Hakasalmen huvila
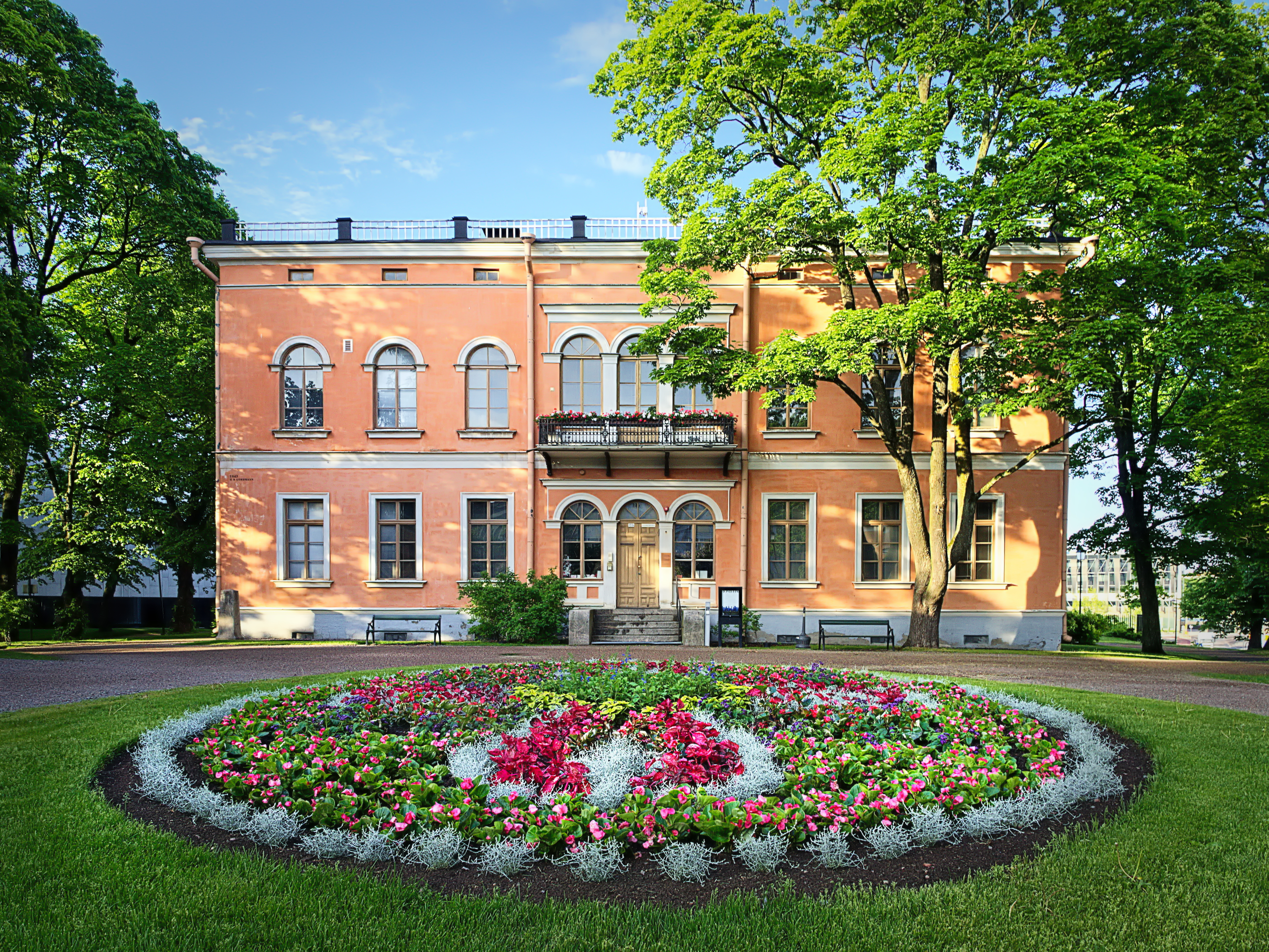
- Interactive map of the Villa Hakasalmi area
- Alternative names: Villa Karamzin

General information
- Type: Villa
- Architectural style: Empire style
- Location: Mannerheimintie 13 B, 00100 Helsinki, Helsinki, Finland
- Coordinates: 60.174716°N 24.934107°E
- Current tenants: Helsinki City Museum
- Completed: 1846
- Owner: City of Helsinki

Design and construction
- Architect: Ernst Lohrmann

Website
- hakasalmivilla.fi

Villa Hakasalmi (Finnish: Hakasalmen huvila, Swedish: Villa Hagasund), also known as Villa Karamzin, is an architecturally and historically important 19th-century villa located in the Etu-Töölö district of central Helsinki, Finland. The villa is situated in a prominent position on Mannerheimintie, next to Finlandia Hall and opposite the National Museum.

Designed by architect Ernst Lohrmann in the Empire style and built in 1844–1846, the villa was originally the summer residence of Senator and State Councillor Carl Johan Walleen. In 1896, Walleen's step-daughter Aurora Karamzin sold the villa to the City of Helsinki, although she was allowed to continue living there until her death six years later.

Since 1912, the villa has been occupied by the Helsinki City Museum, as one of its five main exhibition venues.

== See also ==
- Hakasalmi Street (Keskuskatu)
- Lux Helsinki
