= Keskuskatu =

Pedestrian street in Helsinki, Finland

- Finland Swedish: Centralgatan
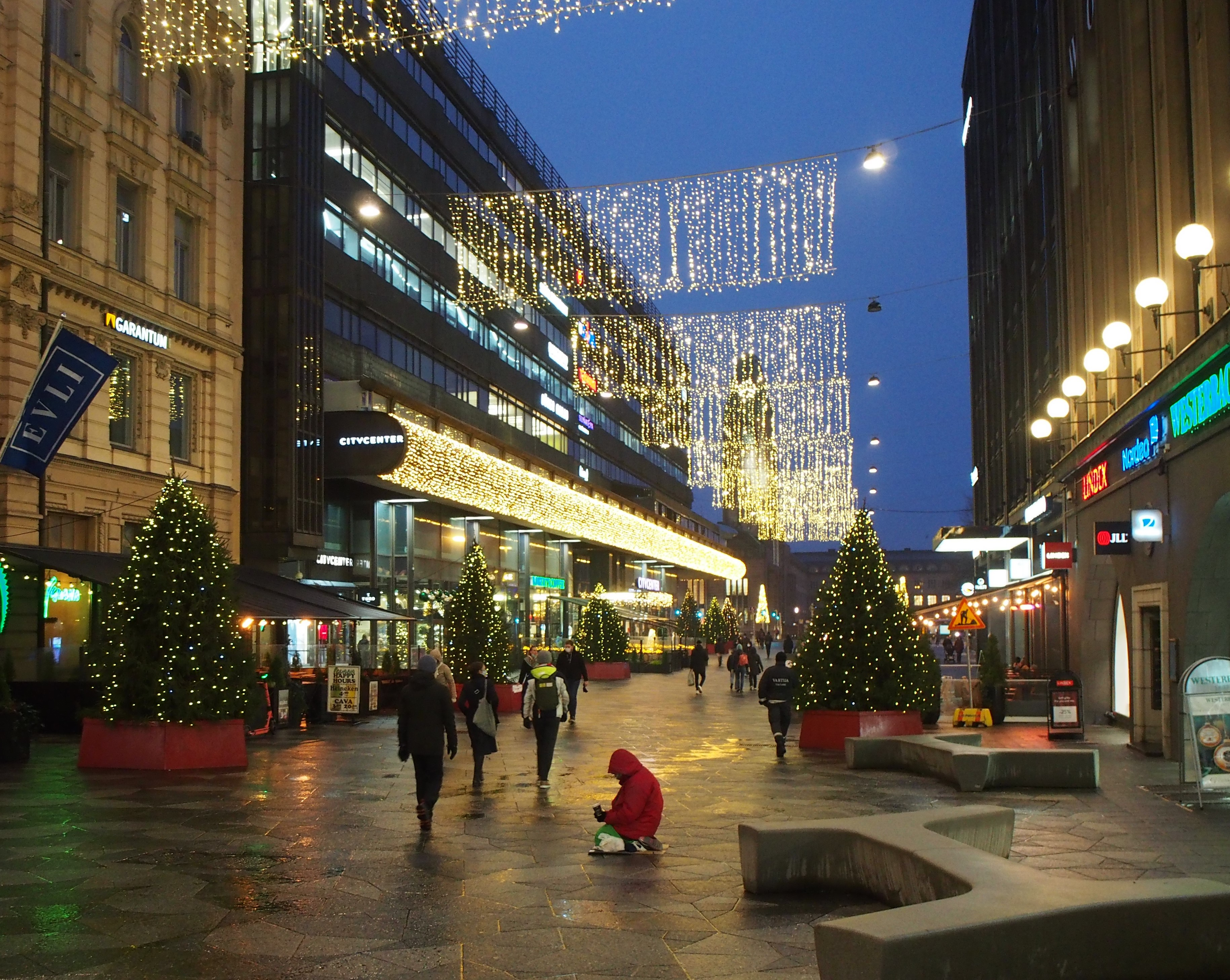
- Keskuskatu at night, decorated for Christmas 2020

- Location within Helsinki (mainland)
- Former names: Hakasalmenkatu; Finland Swedish: Hagasundsgatan
- Length: 284 m (932 ft)
- Width: 21 m (69 ft)
- Location: Kluuvi, Vironniemi, Helsinki, Finland
- Postal code: 00100
- Nearest metro station: Rautatientorin metroasema
- Coordinates: 60.16902°N 24.94291°E
- South end: Pohjoisesplanadi
- Major junctions: Aleksanterinkatu
- North end: Kaivokatu

Construction
- Commissioned: 13 June 1927
- Inauguration: 12 December 1928; 97 years ago

Other
- Designer: Eliel Saarinen
- Status: Pedestrianized

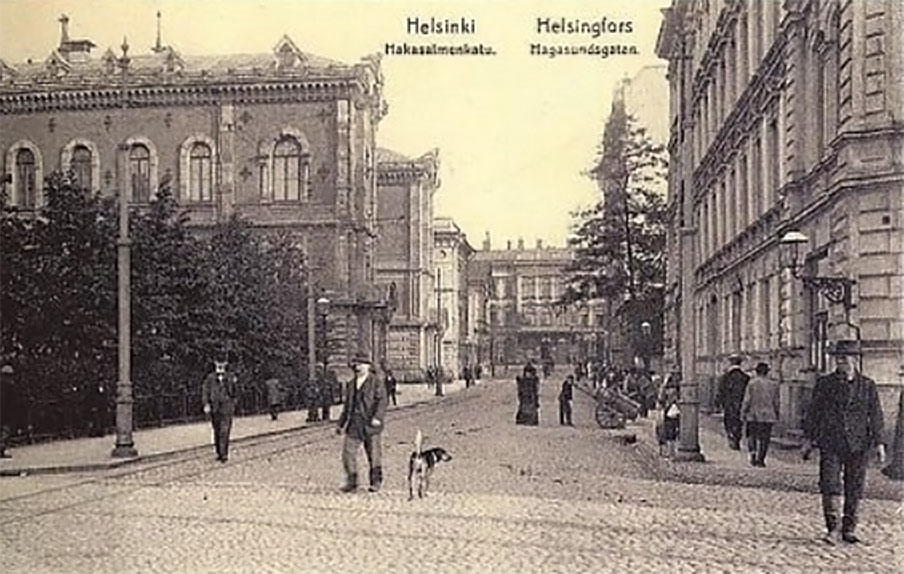
Keskuskatu, then Hakasalmenkatu, in the 1900s. To the right is the Skoha house, later dismantled to make room for the shopping centre, City-Center.

Keskuskatu, literally "Central Street" (Finland Swedish: Centralgatan), is a two block-long pedestrian street in the centrally located Kluuvi neighborhood of Helsinki, Finland. Along the street are located (from south to north): the Stockmann department store, the Rautatalo building, Domus Litonii, the World Trade Center and the Citycenter Mall, nicknamed "Makkaratalo" (lit. "sausage house"). Keskuskatu begins at Pohjoisesplanadi, across from the Swedish Theatre, and ends when it meets Kaivokatu, across from Helsinki Central Station. It is intersected just south of its midpoint by Aleksanterinkatu.

== History ==
An early plan for Keskuskatu. The dashed, red lines indicate the actual implementation.

The street was originally named Hakasalmenkatu (literally "Hakasalmi Street"), Finland Swedish: Hagasundsgatan) and was only one block long, stretching from Aleksanterinkatu to Kaivokatu. The idea to extend the street through a city block to ease traffic congestion between Esplanadi park and the central railway station was first proposed by Helsinki Building Supplies, Ltd. (Finnish: Helsingin Rakennuskauppa Oy) in 1913. A design contest for the proposed street was announced at the time, but ultimately never conducted due to the outbreak of World War I.

In 1916, the businessman Allan Hjelt and the architect Eliel Saarinen started warming up the idea about punching the street through a city block. Their company Ab Centralgatan Oy bought Helsingin Rakennuskauppa Oy (named Oy Building at the time) and received ownership of the properties on Aleksanterinkatu 52 and Pohjoinen Esplanadikatu 37–41. Saarinen made plans of the street and its business properties in the same year, originally about one street's width to the side of Hakasalmenkatu. The plan was published at the end of the year and was received by the city council for consideration. The council approved the plan in March 1917, but decided that a straight line with Hakasalmenkatu would be better for traffic.

In the end of the year 1919 the city and the company Ab Centralgatan Oy started negotiations about moving the street as a direct continuation of Hakasalmenkatu. Soon Ab Stockmann Oy joined the negotiations, and ended up buying the entire company in April 1920. So the street was built as a direct continuation of Hakasalmenkatu all the way up to Pohjoisesplanadi according to the zoning plan approved in 1920, also giving the Stockmann block its current form. Continuing the street also affected the construction plans of the department store, requiring the dismantling of several old buildings such as the old premises of Café Ekberg. Stockmann also received the right to build storage facilities under the street, which has later allowed building an underground corridor connecting the department store with the Akateeminen Kirjakauppa book store. In 1928 the street received its current name according to a proposal from Stockmann.

Keskuskatu was later changed to a walking street in a renovation completed in summer 2014. As part of the renovation, the street was paved with the non-repeating Penrose tiling.

Keskuskatu is one of the properties in the original Finnish edition of Monopoly.

== See also ==
- Villa Hakasalmi
