= Kirjatalo =

Commercial property in Helsinki, Finland

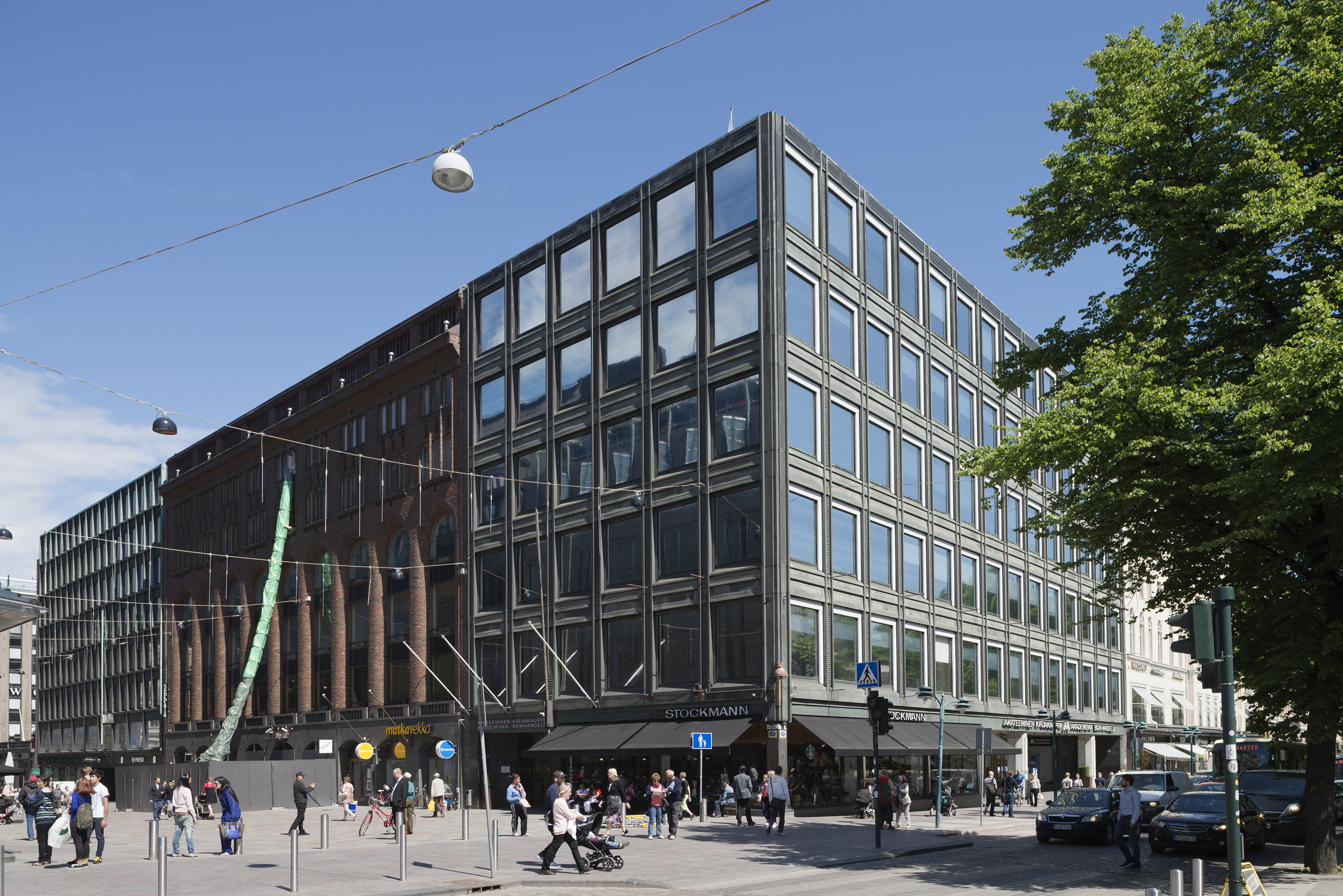
- Kirjatalo seen from southwesterly direction
- Interactive map of the Kirjatalo area
- Alternative names: Kirjapalatsi ('Book Palace')

General information
- Type: Commercial
- Architectural style: Modernism
- Location: Pohjoisesplanadi 39, Helsinki, Finland
- Coordinates: 60.16780°N 24.94333°E
- Completed: 1969

Technical details
- Floor area: 8,861 square metres (95,380 sq ft)

Design and construction
- Architect: Alvar Aalto

Kirjatalo (Swedish: Bokhuset; lit. 'Book House') is a commercial building located on the corner of Pohjoisesplanadi and Keskuskatu in central Helsinki, Finland. It is notable for having been designed by Alvar Aalto. Possibly its best-known resident is the flagship store of the Academic Bookstore chain.

== Background ==
In 1961, the plot's owner, retail company Stockmann, whose main department store is located across the street, announced an architectural competition for the design of a new mixed-use property on the site. The winner of that contest was Alvar Aalto, who had also designed the nearby Rautatalo.

== Architecture ==
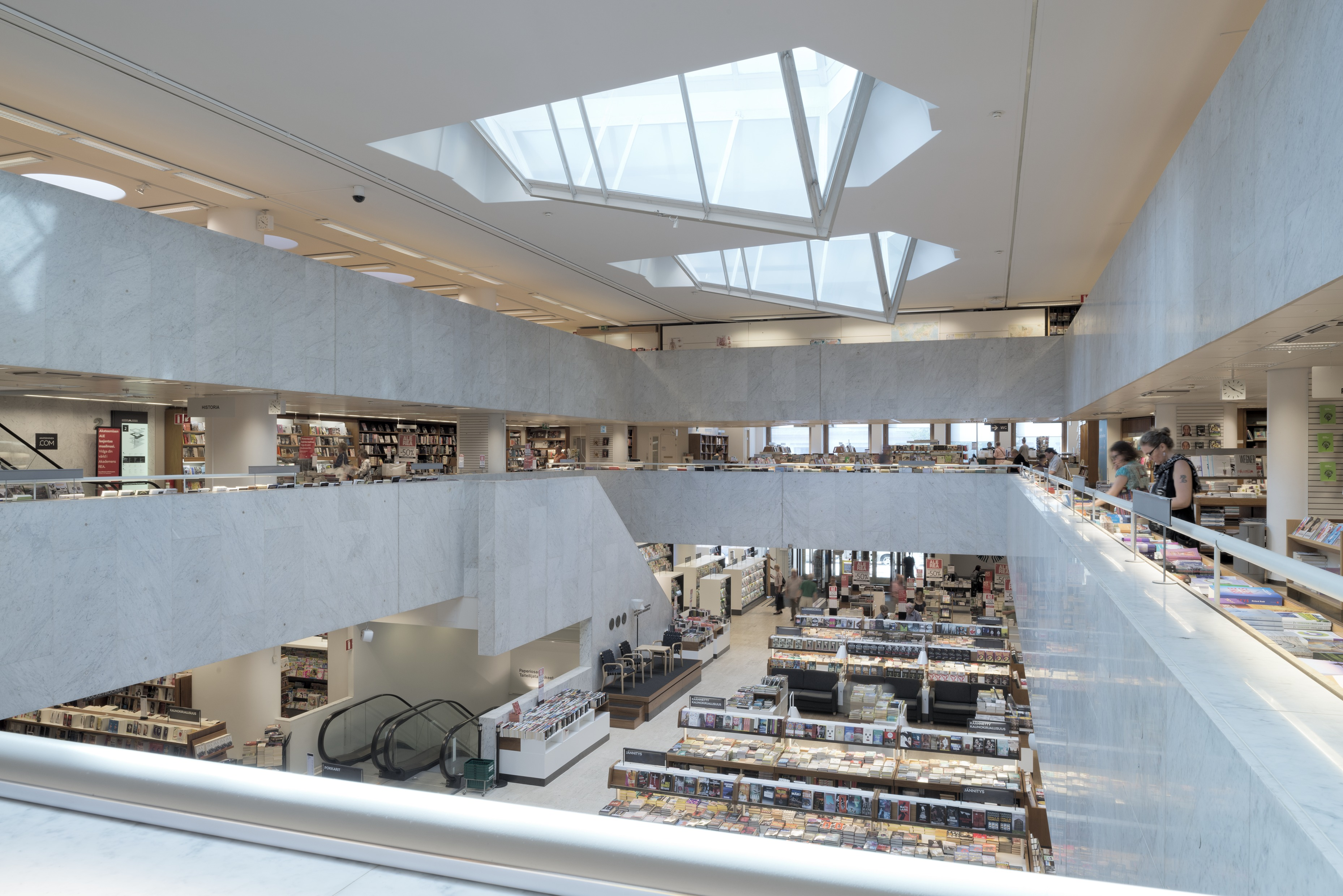
Interior view of Academic Bookstore, occupying the ground and adjacent floors of Kirjatalo

Both the copper-clad exterior, and the central atrium concept of the building's interior, were designed to match those of the Rautatalo.

The central space making up the atrium receives natural illumination from the skylights extending downwards from the roof. Surrounding the atrium are the upper floors' mezzanine structures.

== Recent developments ==
The upper floors, originally allocated to office use, have subsequently been taken over by the book store.

There is a restaurant, Café Aalto, opened in 1986, located on the first floor of the building.

In 2015, Stockmann sold the operations of the Academic Bookstore chain to the Bonnier Group.

In 2018, Stockmann also sold the property to a real estate investor for over EUR 108 m.
