= Jukka Hienonen =

Finnish businessman (born 1961)

Jukka Antero Hienonen (born August 9, 1961) is a Finnish businessman. He has resigned from the position of President & CEO at Finnair Plc August 7, 2009 (effective January 31, 2010). His previous positions include Vice President at Stockmann. Hienonen lives in the city of Kauniainen with his wife and two daughters. He is fluent in Finnish, English, Swedish and Russian.
