= Domus Litonii =

Office building in Helsinki

Coordinates: 60°10′07.3″N 24°56′36.7″E

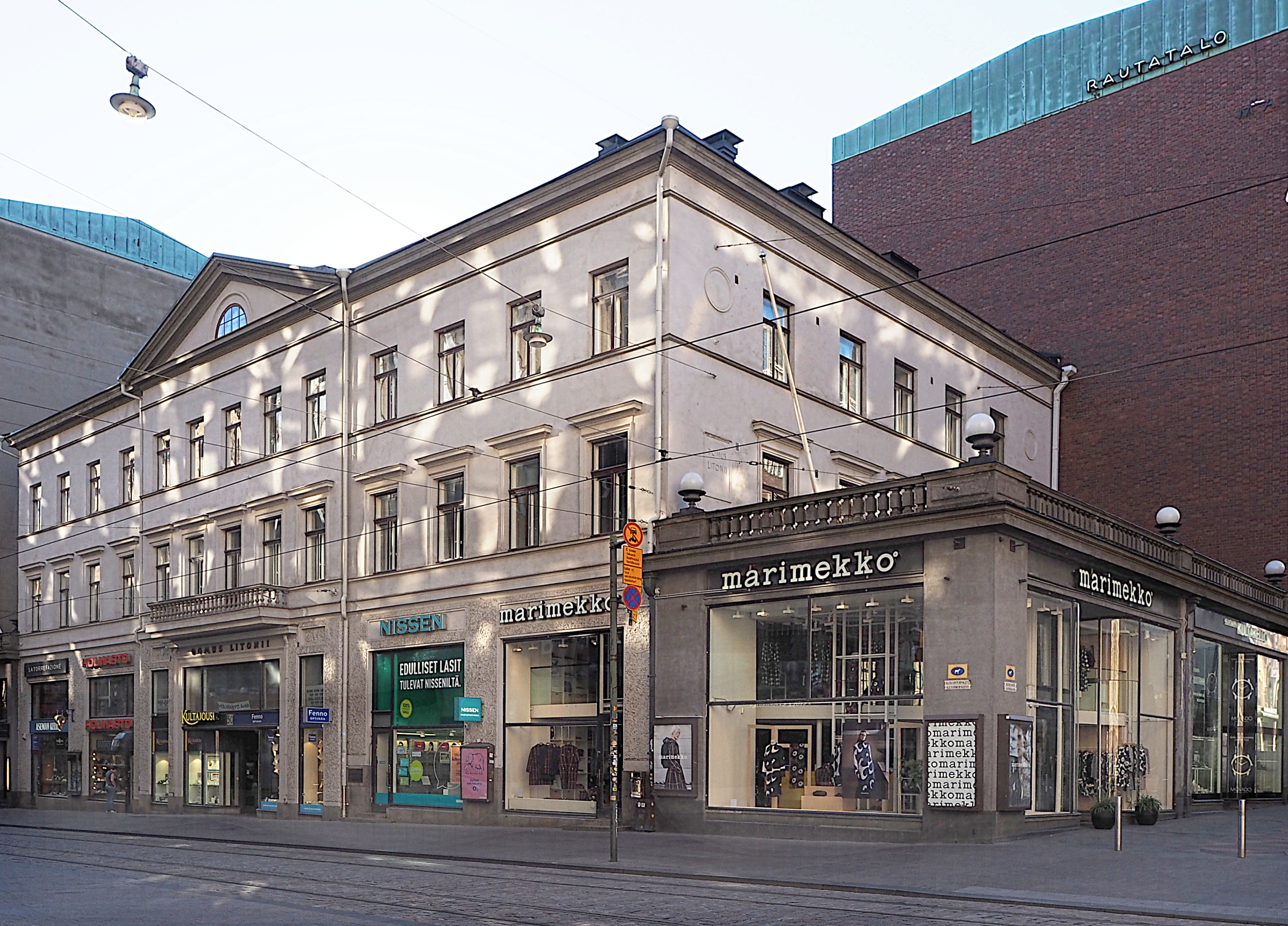
Domus Litonii in 2018

Domus Litonii (Latin for "the Litonius house") is a three-story Empire style residential, commercial and office building with a lower bazaar wing located at Aleksanterinkatu 50 in central Helsinki, Finland.

The building was designed by the master builder Gustaf Leander and it was built from 1845 to 1847. Garden wings were added in 1877 and 1880, and a lower bazaar wing designed by the architect Valter Jung was added on the Keskuskatu side in 1929. The facade on Aleksanterinkatu was modernised in 1936.

The building was commissioned by the master draper and furniture manufacturer Jonas Litonius (1810 - 1864), and the Litonius family continues to own and live in the building to this day. The building is the only remaining 19th century residential building in the entire centre of Helsinki.

The building is protected by construction law, and it has undergone basic repairs from 1993 to 2003.

== Architecture ==
Domus Litonii is a residential and commercial building representing the typical late Empire architecture in Helsinki. Its facade is classically simplified and typical of its period, and for example the decorations in the windows vary greatly between the floors. The bazaar wing with its large windows and the baluster railings on its roof represents the modern business architecture typical to the 1920s.

== History ==
When the building was completed on 3 December 1847 it was one of the largest private houses in the entire capital area of Finland. It was 35 metres wide and over 18 metres high. The first floor had 12 living rooms and three kitchens, and the second floor had 15 living rooms. There was also an underground cellar with 13 vaulted rooms for various purposes. Exceptionally for the time, the building also had its own running water, with a leaded pipe drawing water from a well in the middle of the cellar floor to the kitchens on the living floors. The general waterworks in Helsinki were only built in the 1870s.

From September 1848 to June 1877 Domus Litonii hosted the Technical Real School of Helsinki, later renamed to the Polytechnic School, which was the predecessor of the Helsinki University of Technology. The school rented the entire first floor of the building and three rooms in the cellar. After Jonas Litonius's furniture factory closed down in 1858 the industrial premises on the courtyard were also rented to the school. As the school's functions continuously expanded, it moved to its own premises to a new building near the Hietalahdentori market square in 1877.

The building was thoroughly renovated and repaired from the inside after the Polytechnic School moved out of it to its own premises. A two-story residential building designed by H. E. Lohman was built in its courtyard in 1877, and later dismantled in 1955 to make room for the Rautatalo building. The building was joined to the city's waterworks in 1879 and to the city's sewer works in 1880. It received its first telephone line in 1882. The telephone number 72 was assigned to one of the building's tenants, the accessor C. J. Wiklund.

Plans to construct the Keskuskatu street through the block to help traffic between the Esplanadi park and the Helsinki Central railway station were started in the 1910s. The businessman Allan Hjelt and the architect Eliel Saarinen started the project through their company Oy Centralgatan Ab in 1916 by buying out the properties on Aleksanterinkatu 52 and Pohjoinen Esplanadikatu 37-41. The company also offered to buy out Domus Litonii, but its owners refused the offer. Saarinen made plans for Keskuskatu and buildings to be constructed on it in 1916 and the city council approved the plans on 6 March 1917.

As the Keskuskatu street was constructed, the Ekberg house next to Domus Litonii was dismantled. This gave 7 metres more space to the Litonius family, so they decided to construct a lower bazaar wing on the lot. The wing was designed by the architect Valter Jung and completed in March 1929. It contained 12 business spaces for shops. The facade on Aleksanterinkatu was modernised in 1936 and its shop windows were enlarged. During the renovation, the main building became almost completely a commercial building.

The attic and third floor of the building were badly damaged during the bombing of Helsinki in 1944, when the building was hit by two incendiary bombs and one mine bomb. In 1955, part of the bazaar wing and the courtyard building were dismantled to make room for the Rautatalo building constructed nearby. In 1957 the nine-story commercial building of the Jusélius foundation was constructed on the other side of the building at Aleksanterinkatu 48, and thus Domus Litonii became the last building in the city centre to remind of the city architecture in the 19th century.

In the 1960s, the owners of Domus Litonii made thorough investigations about the possible reuse of the lot which had grown immensely valuable. The architect Woldemar Baeckman made a design for an eight-story commercial building to be built in place of Domus Litonii, and an investigation about whether to protect the building was made in 1962. The architect Marius Af Schultén decided at the time that the building did not need to be protected, as it did not fit in with the buildings surrounding it. This was in line with the scarcity of building protection in the early 1960s in Helsinki, with the most prominent example being the dismantling of the Norrmén house in 1960.

In 1974 when the Helsinki general plan was made, a list of buildings to be protected in the city centre area was compiled, including the main building of Domus Litonii and its bazaar wing because of their late Empire style architecture. The owners of the building opposed the protection and gave af Schultén's statement of the lack of need of protection from November 1974 as the reason. However, the list was not changed, and Domus Litonii became a protected building when the general plan was approved in January 1976.

== In literature ==
Domus Litonii is the setting for the film script Lepäisit jo rauhassa, komisario Palmu ("You should rest in peace already, Inspector Palmu") written by Mika Waltari in 1963 which was ultimately left unfilmed. The main theme of the script written as a play is the protection of the old building: The magister Lautander is about to celebrate the 140-year history of his old home building by creating a foundation to ensure the safety of the building. However, he ends up murdered, and Inspector Palmu, already on retirement, is called to investigate the matter.
