= Ainoa (shopping centre) =

Shopping centre in Finland

Coordinates: 60°10′33.85″N 24°48′16.7″E

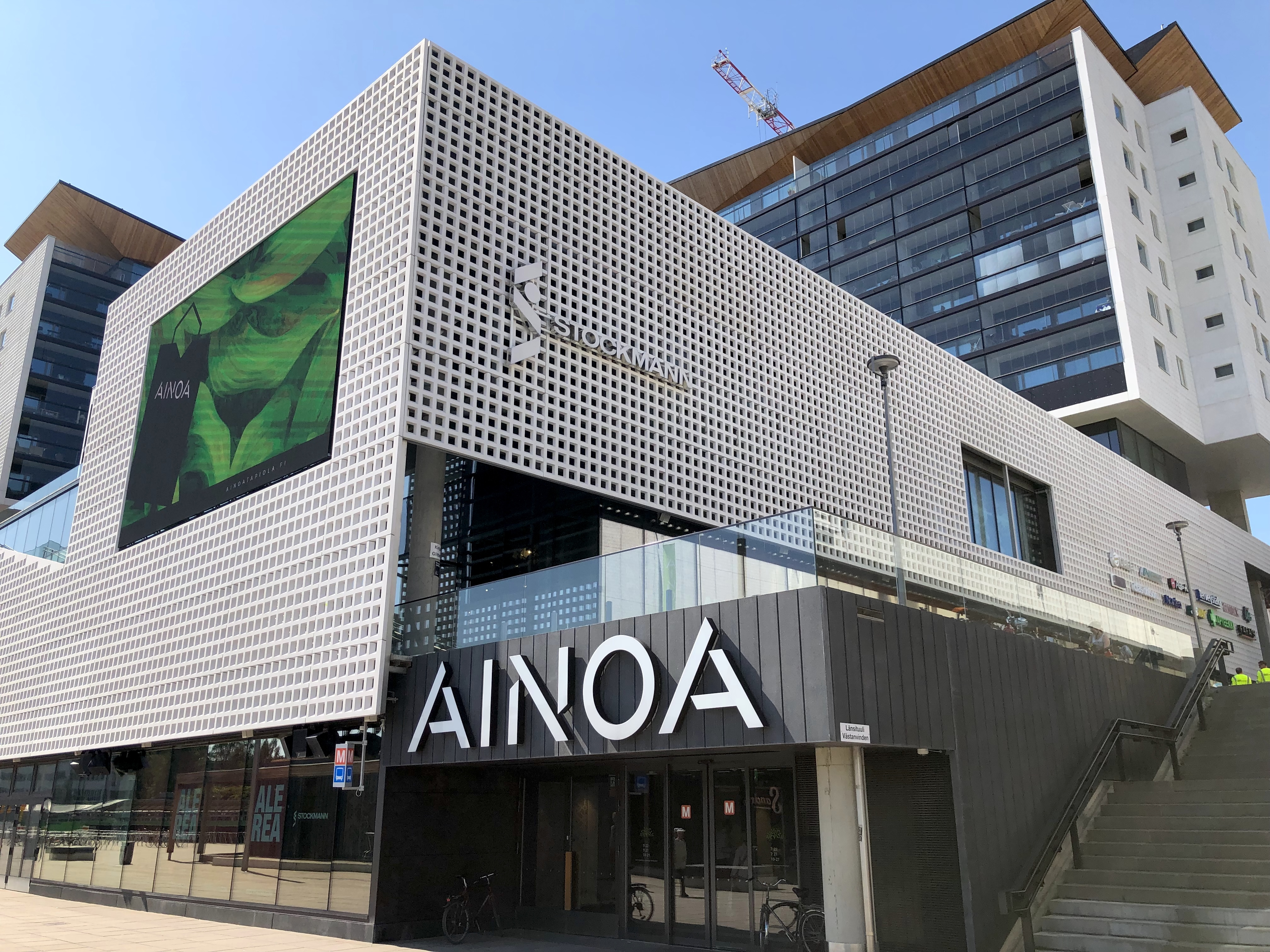
Ainoa shopping centre.

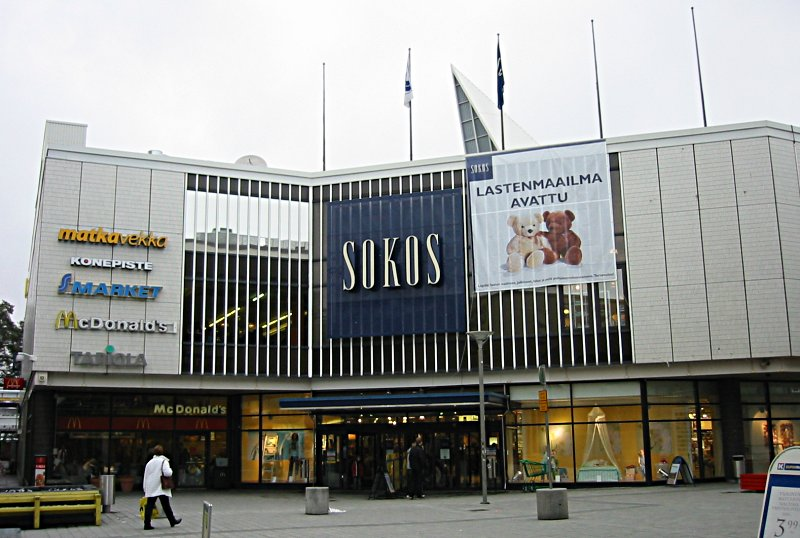
The original building of the Ainoa shopping centre used to house the Tapiola Sokos department store until it was renovated into Ainoa in 2013.

Ainoa is a shopping centre located in Tapiola, Espoo, Finland. Its first phase was opened on 24 October 2013 in a 1979 building that housed the Tapiola Sokos department house until 2011. During the renovation, the building was extended both upwards and downwards.

Ainoa has five floors and about 100 shops, such as K-supermarket, S-Market, Little Bouquet Factory, Stockmann, Alko, H&M, Clas Ohlson, Stadium, XS Lelut and Kultajousi.

The parking hall in connection with Ainoa has approximately 2,000 parking spaces. Ainoa contains a large bus terminal with connections to other parts of Espoo and the neighbouring city of Helsinki. Ainoa is accessible from the Helsinki Metro through the Länsimetro extension.

The design of Ainoa concentrates on the coziness of the shopping centre and the overall image of Tapiola. For example, the interior features a lot of light-coloured wood and plants intended to convey the spirit of the garden city of Tapiola.

The bottom floor of the shopping centre, designated the floor M, hosts grocery stores, fast-food restaurant and quick-access stores. The fashion and interior design stores are mainly located on the first and second floors. The third floor hosts a Terveystalo health centre and the Ainoa Food Garden restaurant area. The fourth floor hosts some beauty care specialist stores.

== History ==
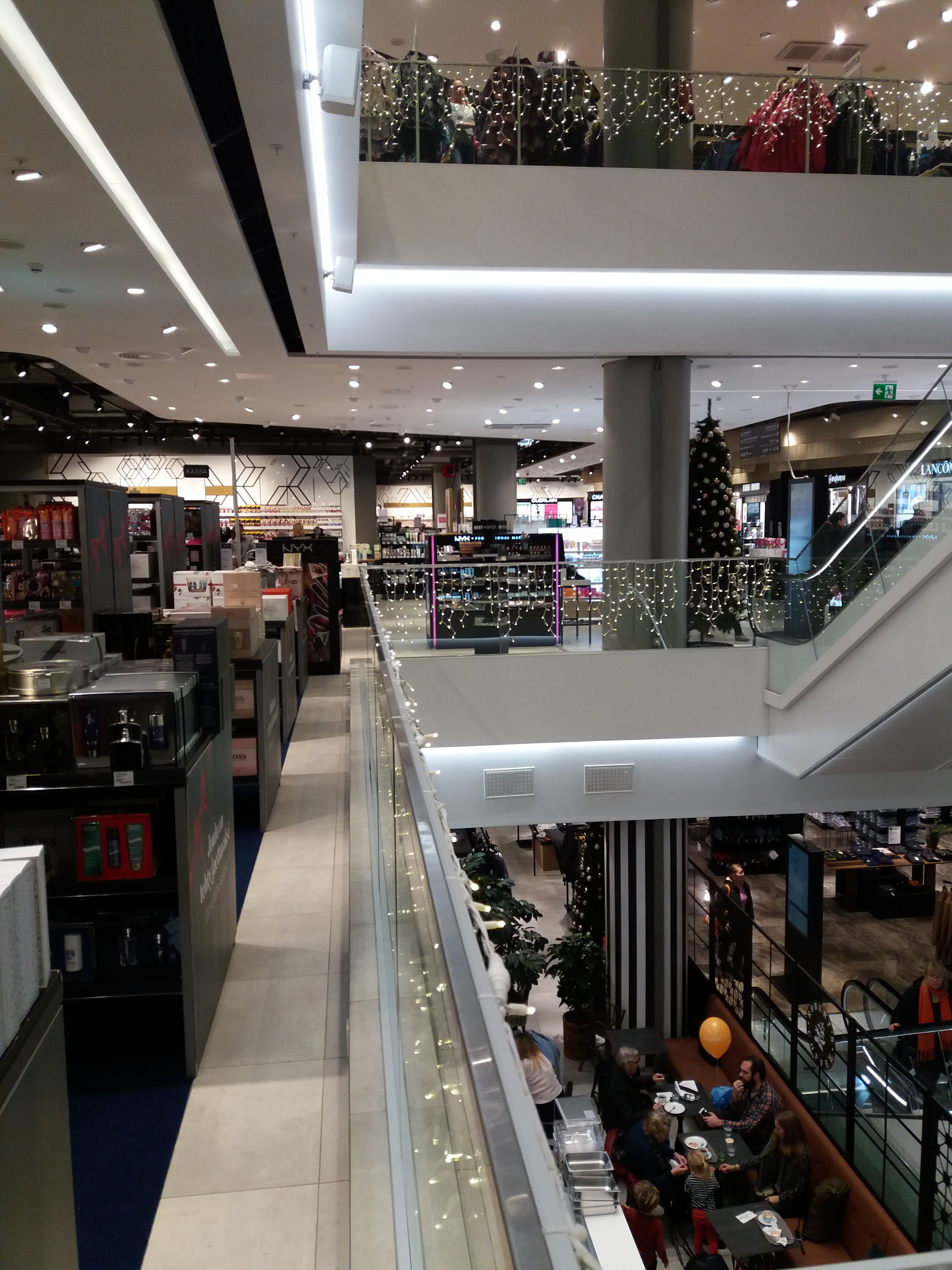
Stockmann department store at Ainoa.

The first stage of Ainoa was opened on 24 October 2013. Part of the shopping centre was built into a building built in 1979 which hosted the Sokos department store in Tapiola until 2011. The building was completely renovated and space for a K-Supermarket grocery store was cleared underneath it. The total surface area of the first stage is about 10 thousand square metres, and it hosted about 30 stores at the start.

The second stage of Ainoa was opened on 16 March 2017. The total surface area of the extension part is about 20 thousand square metres, and the Tapiola branch of the Stockmann department store moved into it. The extension part also includes stores such as Clas Ohlson, Lindex, Pizza Hut and Subway. Many apartments will also be built in connection with the extension part.

The third and final stage of Ainoa was opened on 24 October 2019. More business space and two apartment buildings were built in the place of the old building of the Tapiola Stockmann department store, which was demolished in 2017. The third stage brought the total surface area of the shopping centre to 50 thousand square metres. The third stage of Ainoa hosts businesses such as K-Market, Little Bouquet Factory, Burger King, Plantagen, Suomalainen Kirjakauppa and the AINOA Food Garden restaurant area. An Elixia gym was also opened in Ainoa in early 2020.

== Connections ==
The Länsimetro extension of the Helsinki metro was completed in November 2017, allowing a direct connection from the Tapiola metro station and the Merituulentie bus terminal to the Ainoa shopping centre. A parking garage of about two thousand spaces was opened in two stages in 2013 and 2016. There is also a covered parking garage for bicycles in connection with the Ainoa shopping centre.

== Gallery ==
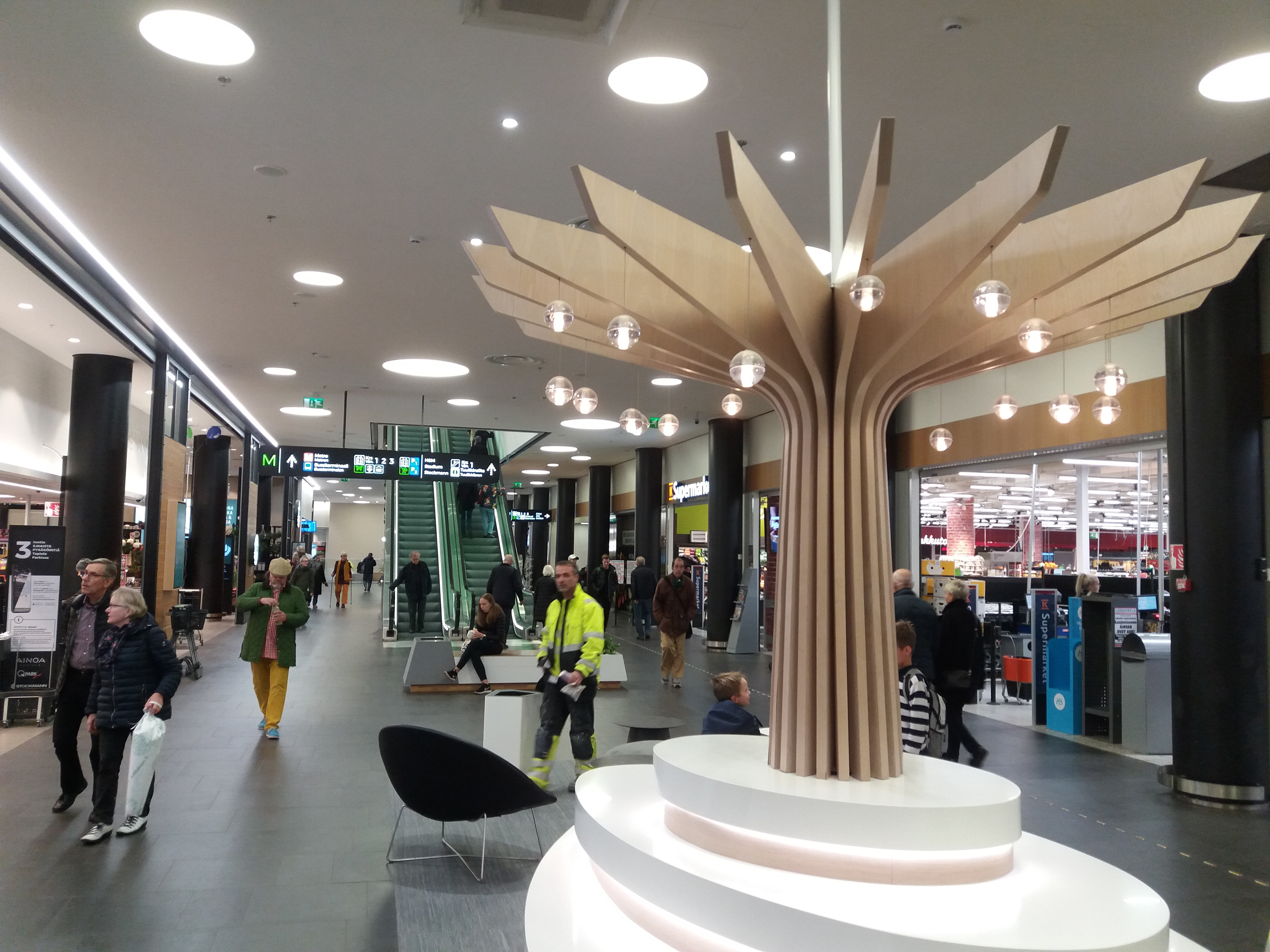
The floor M features grocery stores.

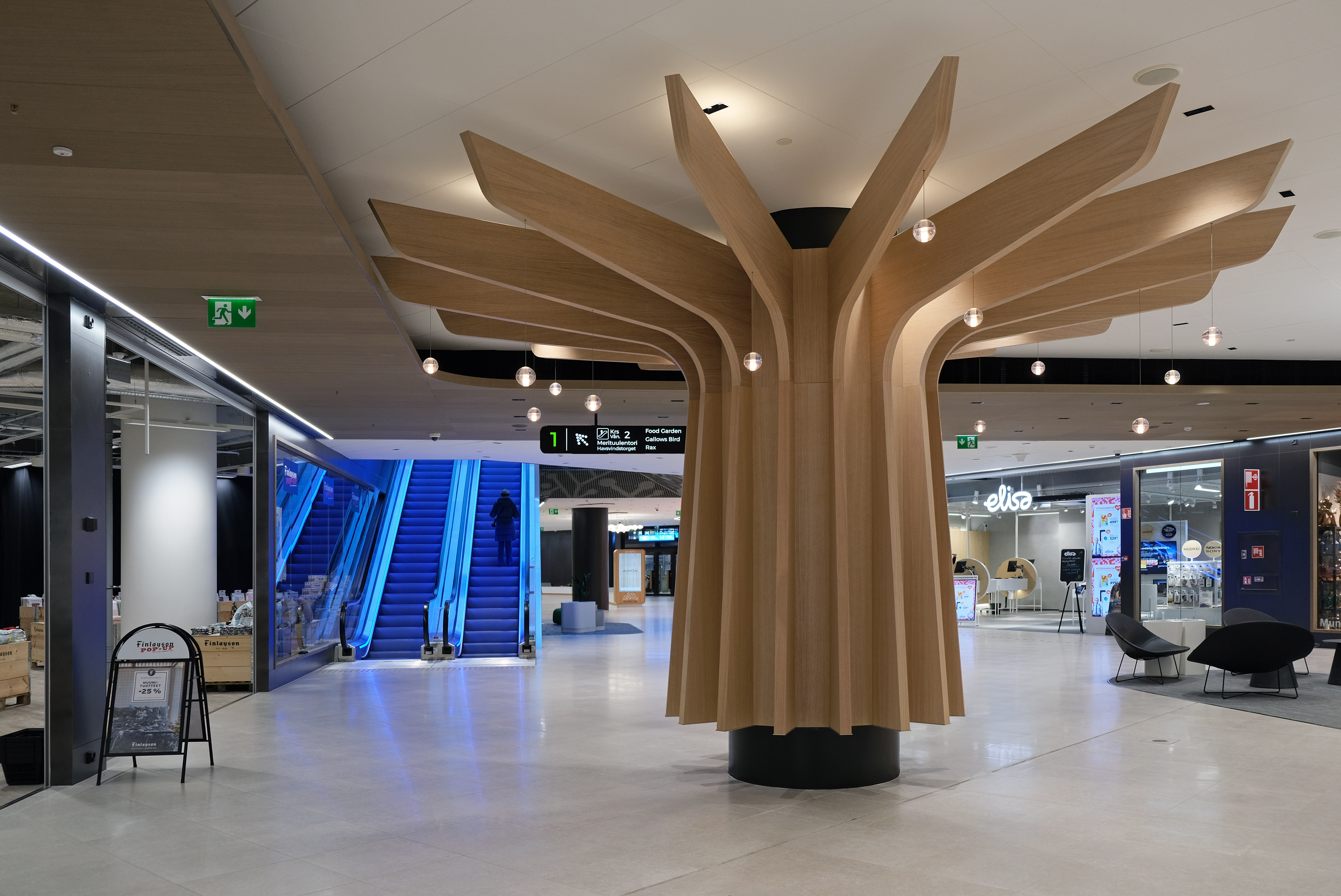
Floor 1

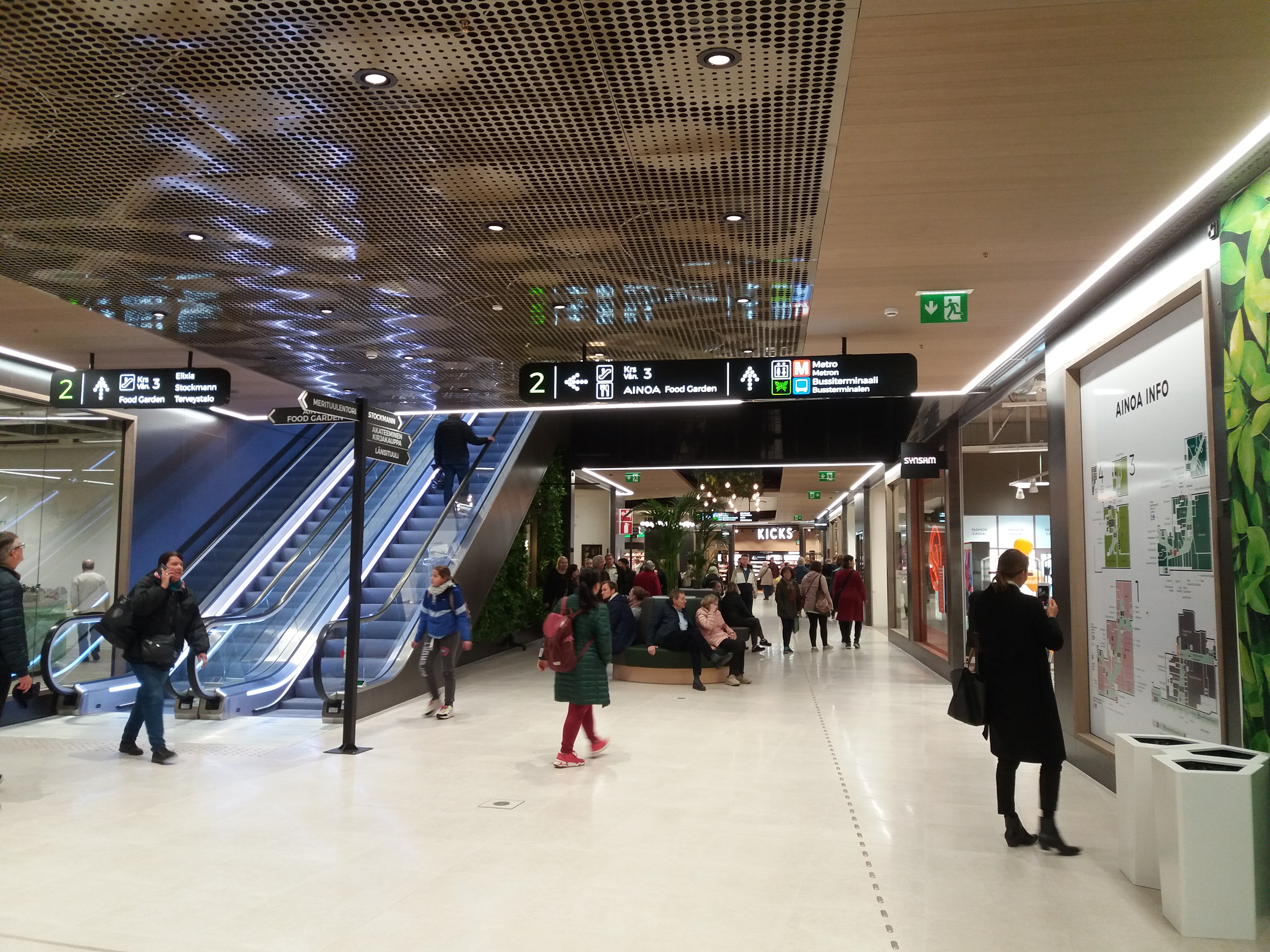
Floor 2

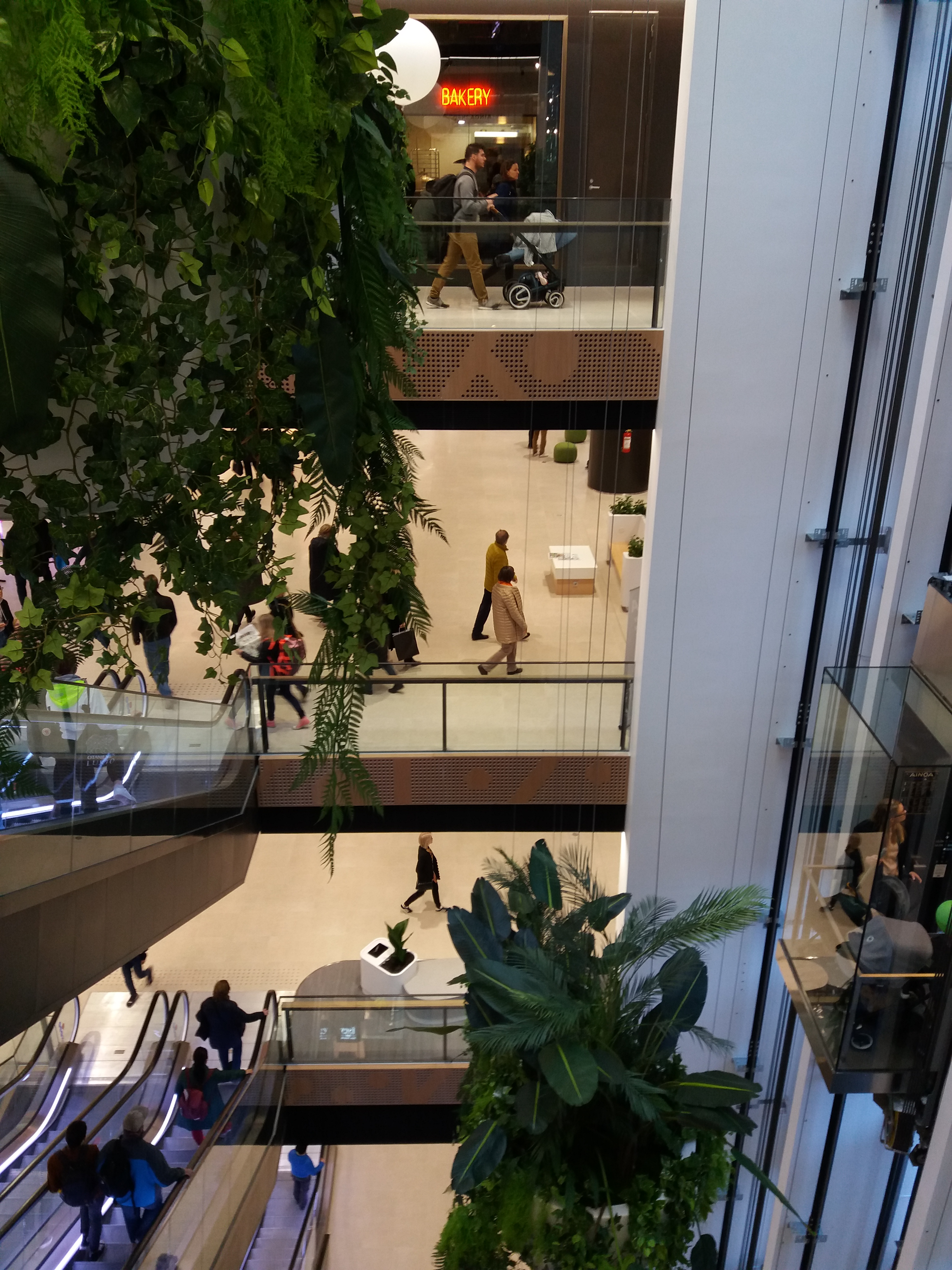
The light garden

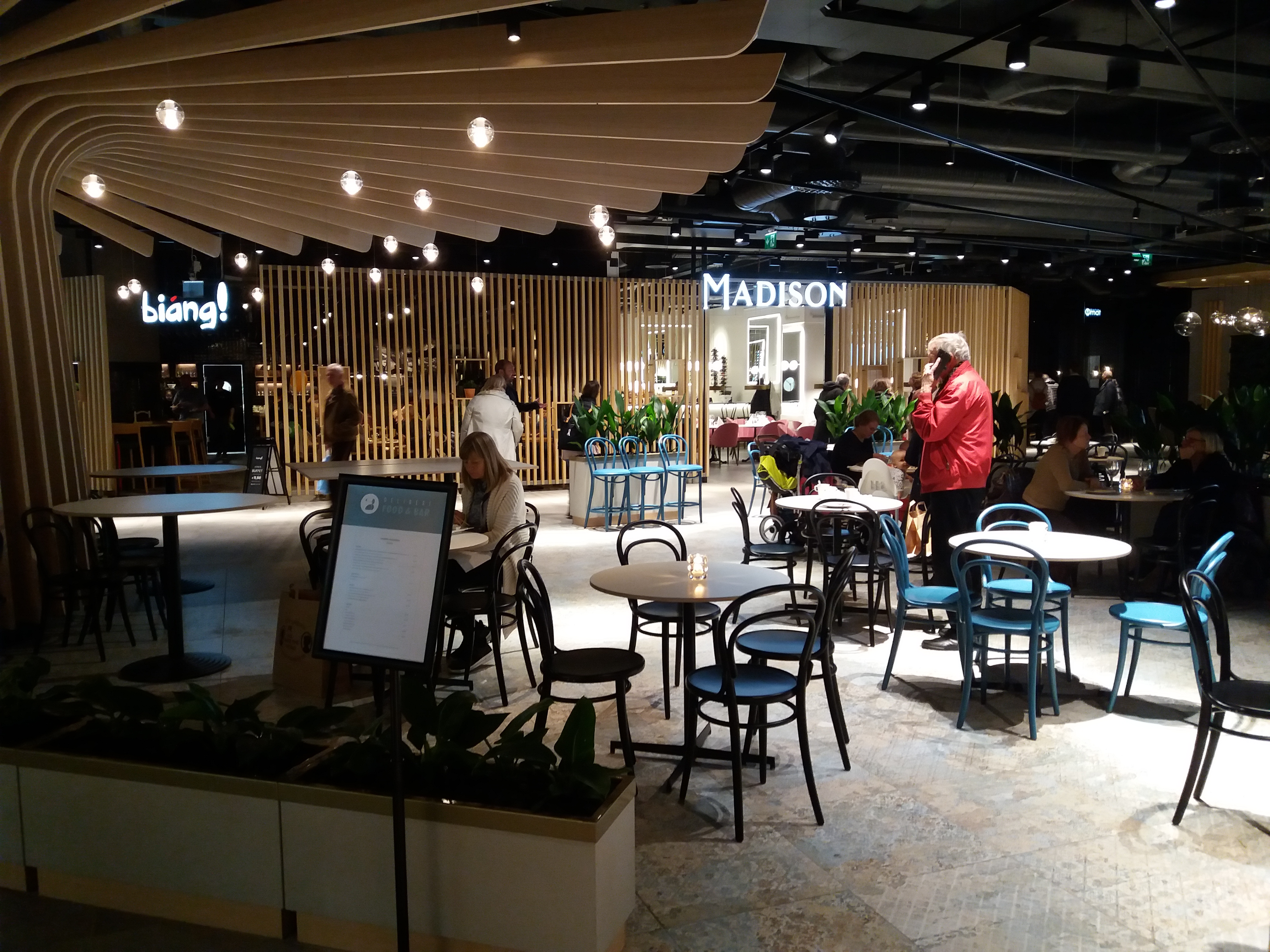
The Ainoa Food Garden area on floor 3

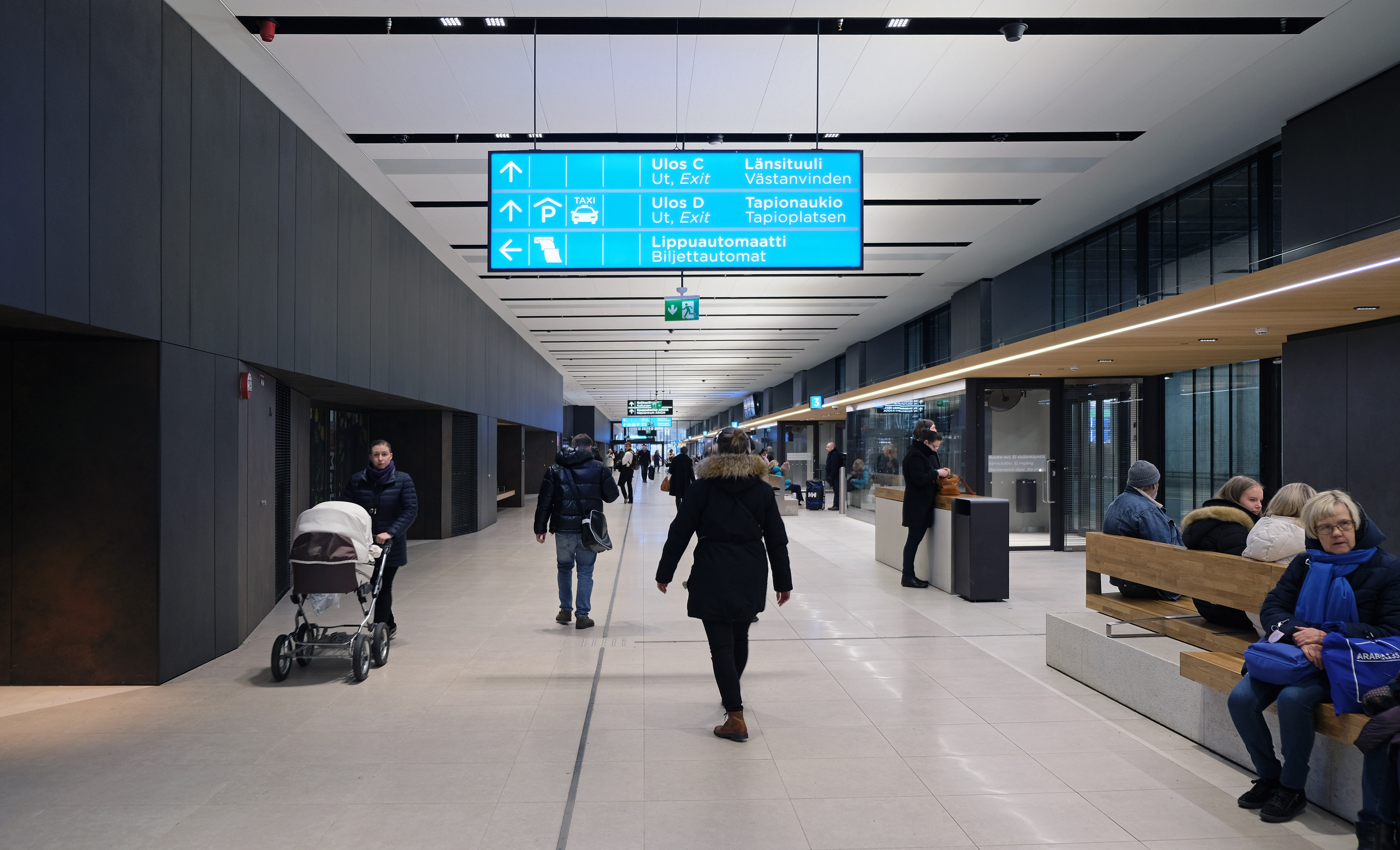
The bus terminal on Merituulentie
