= Georg Franz Stockmann =

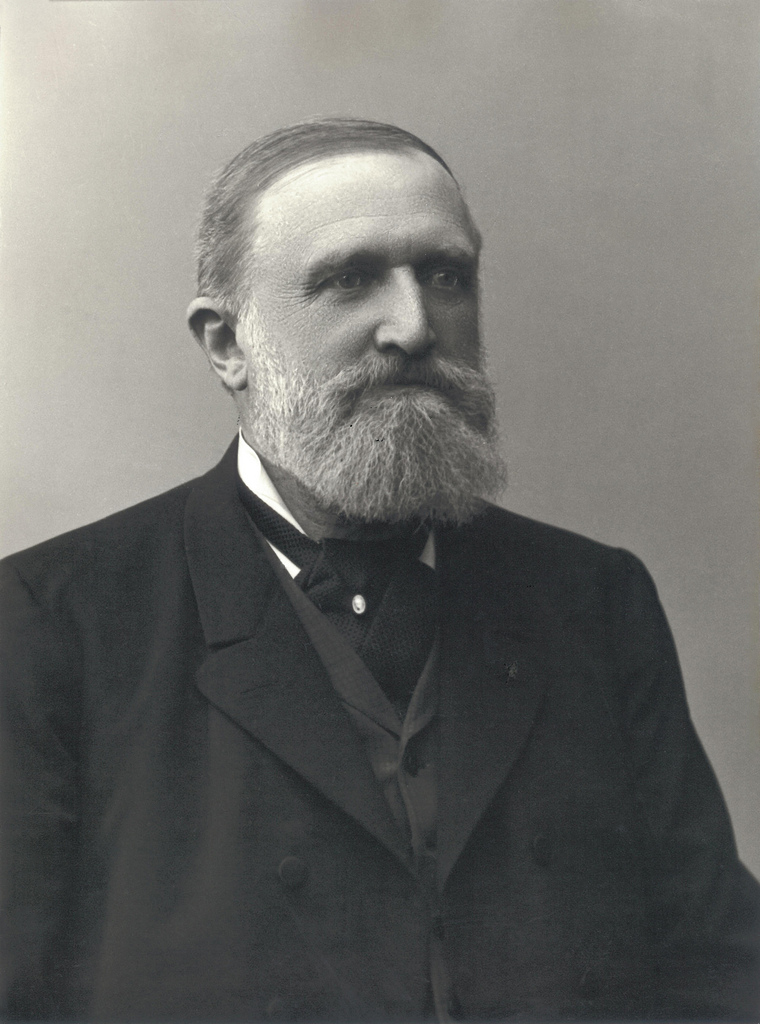
- G. F. Stockmann, 1894
- Born: Heinrich Georg Franz Stockmann; 14 January 1825; Ritzerau, Duchy of Saxe-Lauenburg (present-day Germany)
- Died: 6 January 1906 (aged 80); Bad Kreuznach, Kingdom of Prussia, German Empire
- Resting place: Hietaniemi Cemetery, Helsinki
- Citizenship: German Empire; Grand Duchy of Finland
- Occupation: Businessman
- Known for: Founder of Stockmann
- Spouse: Betty Dorothea Johanna Block (m. 1855)

Heinrich Georg Franz Stockmann (14 January 1825 – 6 January 1906) was a German-Finnish businessman, commercial counsellor and founder of the Stockmann department store in Helsinki, Finland. He was a pioneer in Finnish retail trade and built one of Helsinki's largest commercial enterprises during the latter half of the 19th century.

== Early life and arrival in Finland ==
Stockmann was born in Ritzerau in the Duchy of Saxe-Lauenburg (present-day Germany) near Lübeck as the son of forester Joachim Franz Hermann Stockmann and Dorothea Louise Eleonore Müller. From the age of 15 to 20, he worked as an apprentice at a colonial goods store in Lübeck, and then for seven years at various paint and chemical companies in Lübeck and Hamburg. He originally planned to emigrate to America, but came to Finland in 1852 when Notsjö glassworks owner Adolf Törngren was seeking workers in Germany. Törngren employed Stockmann as a bookkeeper and cashier at the glassworks. Stockmann obtained Finnish citizenship in 1860.

== Business career ==
When the glassworks started sales operations in Helsinki in 1858, Stockmann was appointed manager of its first retail branch at Market Square. The store was expanded into what was described as a "country store in the middle of the city", selling fabrics, household goods and hardware. In 1862, Stockmann purchased the business and renamed it G.F. Stockmann. He broadened the product range to include cotton and woollen goods, porcelain, ironware and agricultural machinery, and also began importing goods from abroad and engaging in wholesale trade. By the early 1870s, the firm was one of the largest commercial enterprises in Helsinki.

An important factor behind Stockmann's growth was Helsinki's rapid expansion: the city's population increased sixfold during Stockmann's active years there (1858–1906). The building boom particularly benefited the hardware trade, which from the 1870s became Stockmann's primary line of business.

A plaque commemorating Stockmann on the ground floor of the Stockmann flagship department store in Helsinki, Finland.

In 1880, Stockmann moved his store to a building on the corner of Senate Square, later known as the "Kiseleff Bazaar". The premises represented a new style of retail architecture with large display windows, separate cash registers and an internal telephone system. At the time of the move, the company had 12 employees; by the end of the century, the number had grown to 32. From 1883, the company began distributing printed product catalogues.

During the 1890s, Stockmann was hit hard by a serious crisis in the construction industry. As a major supplier of building materials, the company suffered significant losses, and several properties came into the company's possession, including Helsingfors Ångbageri Ab (Helsinki Steam Bakery). Nevertheless, expansion continued in parallel: Stockmann opened dedicated shops for Arabia factory products and for sporting goods – with bicycles as the main product – as well as a branch for building materials in Kallio in 1897.

In 1902, Stockmann reorganized his business into a limited liability company and divided it between himself and his sons Karl and Frans. His eldest son Karl Stockmann was simultaneously appointed managing director.

== Personal life ==
Stockmann married Betty Dorothea Johanna Block in 1855. He died in Bad Kreuznach in the Kingdom of Prussia, and he is buried at Hietaniemi Cemetery in Helsinki.
