= City-Center =

Building in Helsinki, Finland

Coordinates: 60°10′12″N 24°56′31″E

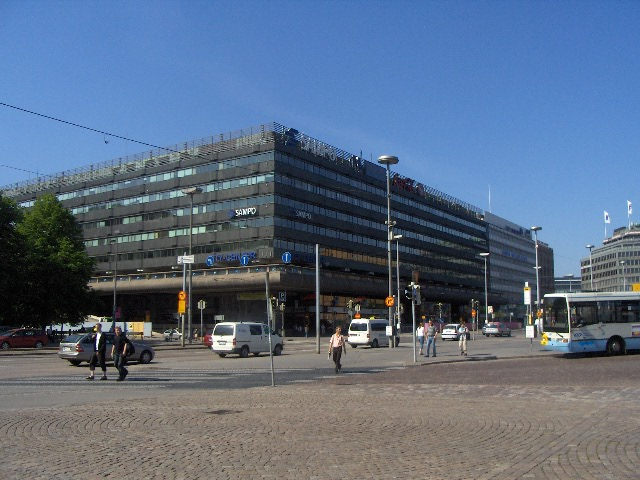
Makkaratalo, the only completed part of the original City-Center plan

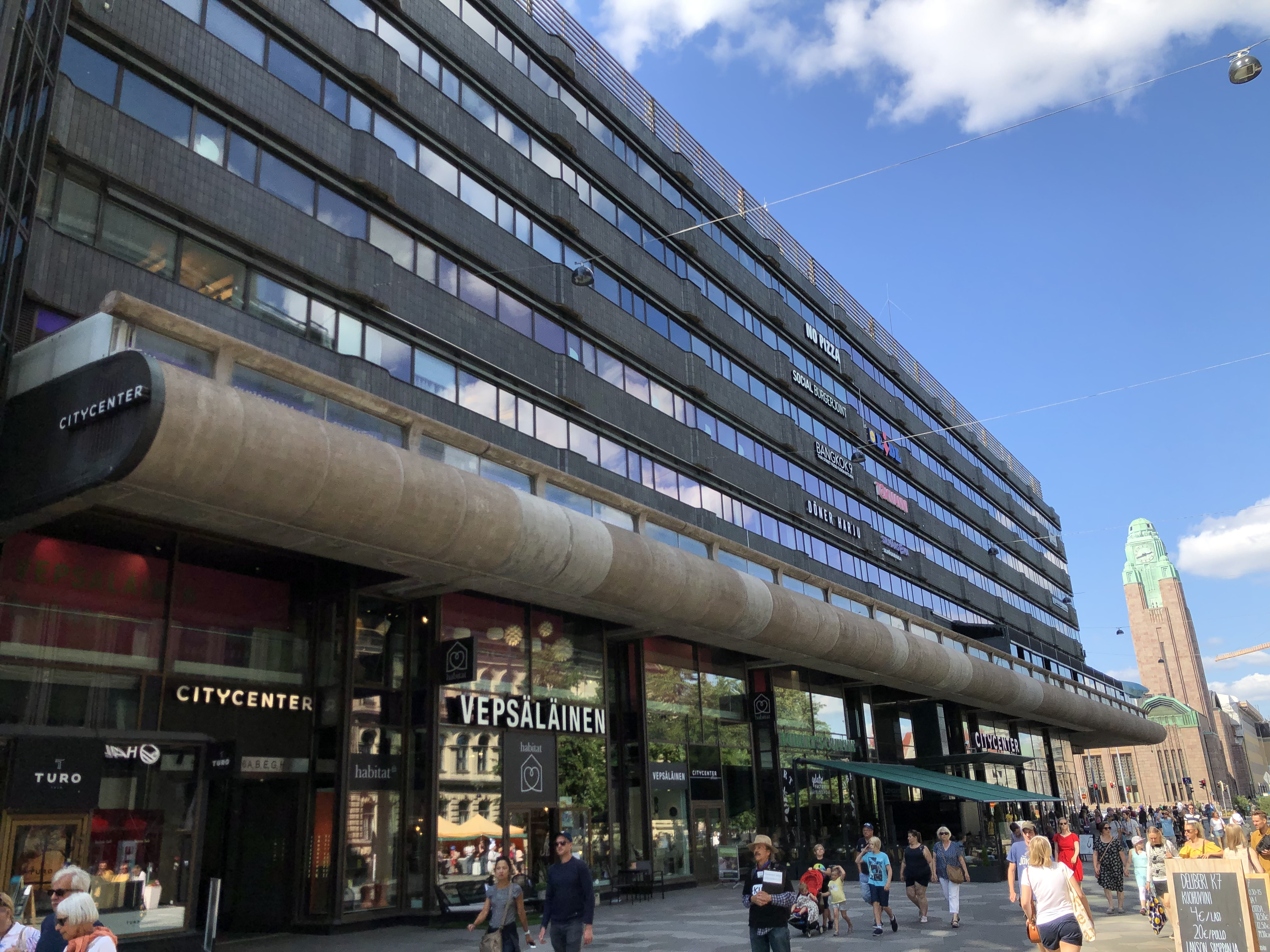
A close-up view of Makkaratalo viewed from Keskuskatu, showing the characteristic "sausage" in the middle

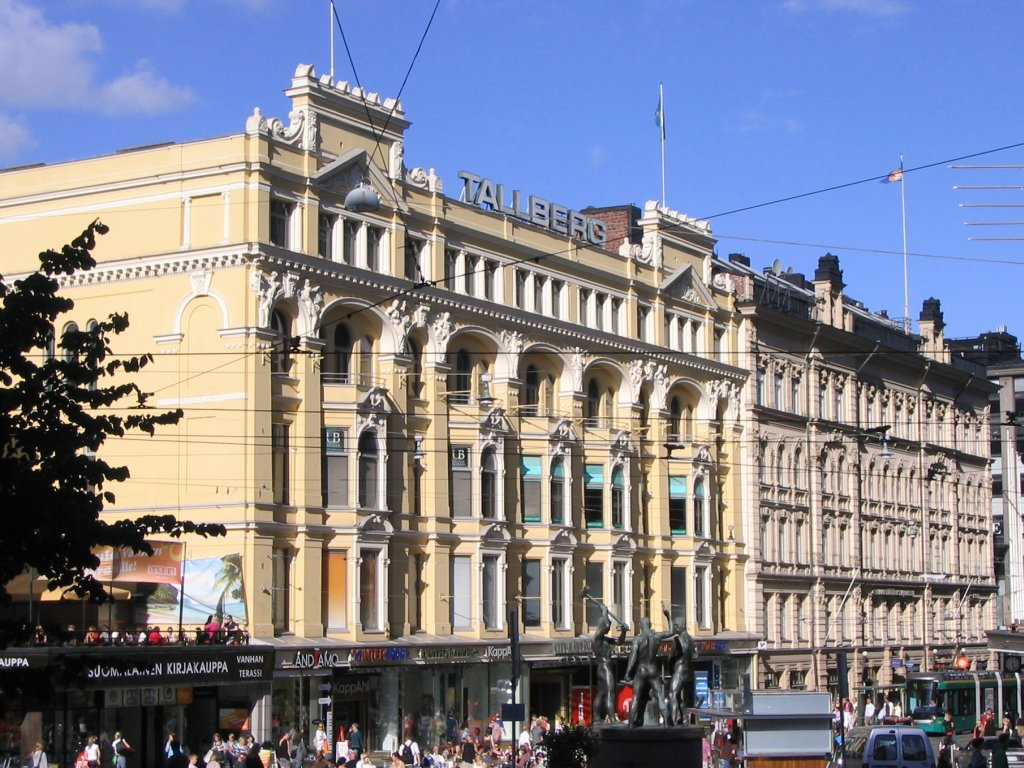
The Tallberg and Hermes buildings, which would have been demolished according to the original City-Center plan

City-Center is a partly implemented plan to raze and rebuild the block between the central Helsinki streets of Kaivokatu, Keskuskatu and Aleksanterinkatu, creating a unified, modern appearance for the area. The plan was originally drafted between 1958 and 1960 by Viljo Revell; Heikki Castrén continued work on the plan after Revell's death in 1964. The fulfillment of the plan would have required the demolition of several old buildings that are today considered to be a vital part of Helsinki's heritage.

The only part of the plan that was implemented as planned is the 1967 office and shopping centre building right across the street from the Helsinki Central railway station, popularly known as Makkaratalo, Finnish for "sausage house": the elevated parking lot occupying the third floor is encircled by a decorative railing which is said to resemble a sausage. The first occurrence of the name was in a caricature drawn by the Finnish cartoonist Kari Suomalainen in Helsingin Sanomat. In the cartoon, a man is buying food from a snack bar near the Makkaratalo. He points at the railing, and the snack bar vendor replies, "Well, I'm just a small-time businessman."

Today, the term "City-Center" refers to the entire shopping complex consisting of the Makkaratalo, various older properties, and the pathways connecting them to the adjacent streets. However, the term is rarely used and is unfamiliar even to most natives of Helsinki.

The Finnish real estate company Sponda bought the City-Center in 2000 and has extensively renovated it. The building is currently protected by Finland's National Board of Antiquities as part of the city's heritage. In 2005 a decision was made to place the building under protection, allowing removal of the car-ramps but not the "sausage".

The Helsingin kaupunginmuseo (Helsinki city Museum Bureau) also concluded in a written statement that

The Makkaratalo reflects the Finnish ideology of planning in the 60's, e.g., the view that the city of Helsinki should prepare for a wider use of cars as part of becoming a modern metropolis. It is also a prime example of Viljo Revell's work. In the view of the Helsinkian, the Makkaratalo presents the perspective of everyday life. It has become a vital part of the Helsinki cityscape and a part of the collective memory of Helsinkians.

However, this view can not be considered to be widespread in Helsinki. The Makkaratalo is commonly considered an eyesore, and it has many years won the unofficial "Most Hideous Building in Helsinki" competition. There have been several public statements about its ugliness, considering its very central place. For instance, the former leader of the National Board of Antiquities has stated that he considers the building an ugly error in judgement in city-planning, and would not oppose its demolition. The Makkaratalo also topped a 2004 poll by Helsingin Sanomat as the ugliest building in Helsinki. It was also featured in a 2005 series in Helsingin Sanomat about the oddest construction plans in the rapid growth of the 1960s.
