= Heikki Castrén =

Finnish architect (1929–1980)

- Born: 8 August 1929
- Died: 24 January 1980 (aged 50)
- Education: Helsinki University of Technology
- Occupation: Architect
- Known for: Toronto City Hall, Makkaratalo

Heikki Castrén (8 August 1929 – 24 January 1980) was a Finnish architect known for his work to public architecture in Helsinki and internationally. His father Viljo Castrén, a professor of hydraulic engineering at the Helsinki University of Technology.

== Early life and education ==
Heikki Castrén completed his secondary education from Töölö Secondary School in 1948 and graduated as an architect from the Helsinki University of Technology in 1956.

== Notable works ==
Castrén gained international recognition when he won the first prize in the 1958 Architectural design competition for Toronto City Hall, with Viljo Revell, Bengt Lundsten, and Seppo Valjus.

Some of his notable works include:

- Makkaratalo (Helsinki city center)
- Oulunkylä Church
- Fortum Headquarters
- Seinäjoki railway station
- Espoo City Hall
- Pohjola Insurance building
