= Lindex =

Swedish-Finnish clothing-store chain

AB Lindex

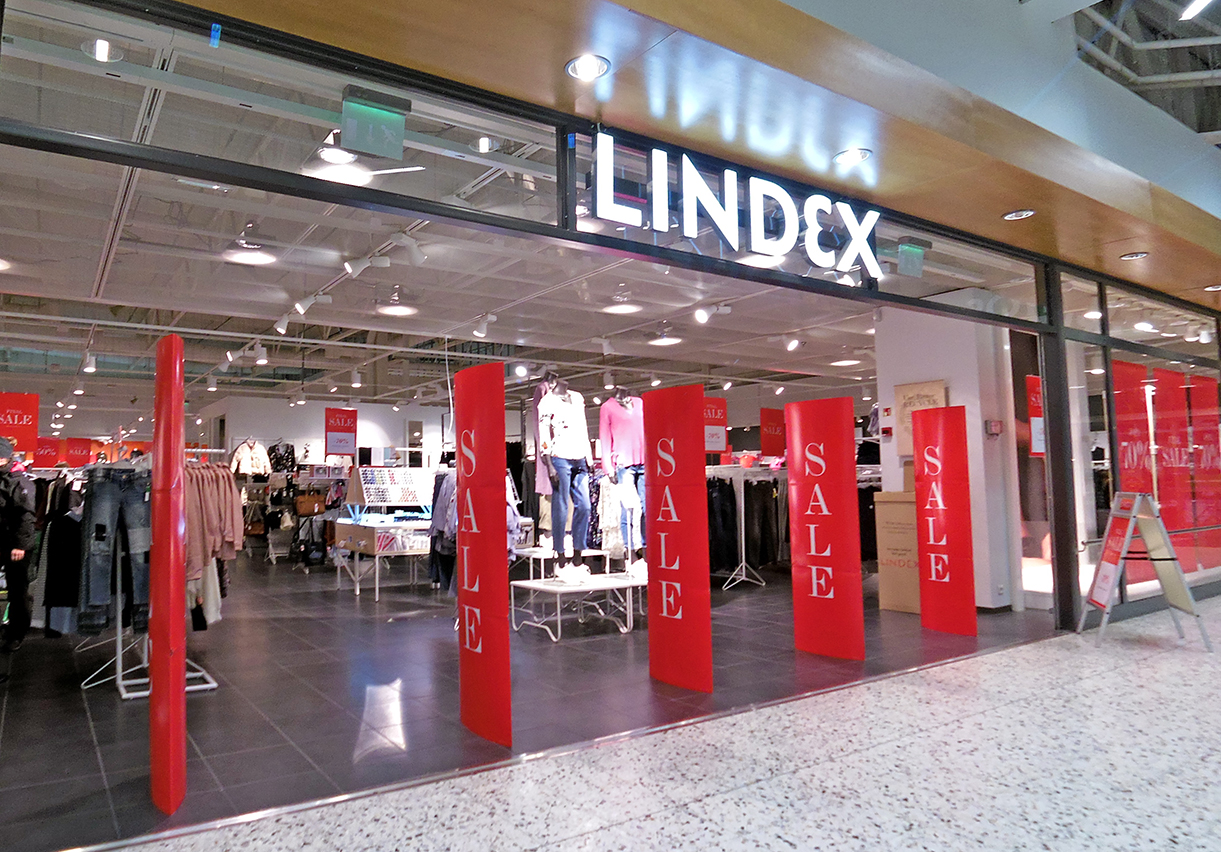
- Industry: Fashion
- Founded: Alingsås, Sweden (1954)
- Headquarters: Gothenburg, Sweden
- Key people: Susanne Ehnbåge CEO
- Products: Clothing, cosmetics
- Revenue: ▲633.1 Mil. EUR (2023)
- Owner: Lindex Group
- Number of employees: 4000
- Parent: Lindex Group plc

Former logo

Lindex was founded as a Swedish fashion chain in 1954, however since 2007 it became a part of the Finnish Stockmann Group. The company has around 5000 employees and approximately 480 stores in 18 markets in the Nordic countries, the Baltic states, Central Europe and the Middle East. In addition to sales in store, Lindex also offers their fashion assortment via online shopping in 28 countries: all EU countries plus Norway. The company has had a rapid international expansion and sales growth. The assortment includes several different concepts within women's wear, lingerie, kids’ wear and cosmetics.

== The history of Lindex ==
In 1954, Ingemar Boman and Bengt Rosell opened the lingerie store Fynd in Alingsås. Shortly thereafter, the Lindex company of Gothenburg was acquired, and this was the name then given in time to all the subsequent stores. During the sixties the lingerie selection was complemented by women's wear, in particular jumpers and blouses. Operations were expanded and the first Lindex store in Norway was opened.

During the seventies Lindex continued to grow in Sweden and Norway. The assortment was expanded and Lindex also became known for skirts and trousers as well as kids’ wear. The eighties meant major changes for Lindex and the expansion reached record levels. Major changes occurred in the buying routines, since almost all textile manufacturing moved abroad. Lindex now tested new markets such as Denmark, Great Britain and Finland, but by the end of the eighties, operations were focused on Sweden, Norway and Finland.

In August 1993, IK Partners (formerly Industri Kapital) acquired Lindex from ICA, and Lindex opened its first production office in Hong Kong, initiating inspections to check that no child labour occurred at the suppliers. That same year, Lindex sold the fashion chain Gulins, with 770 employees, to the Norwegian Finansgruppen. The company's requirements on suppliers were increased and a code of conduct for all suppliers was introduced. During the nineties the company also started to make serious efforts with regard to environmental issues, in addition to the introduction of a loyalty card scheme - the Lindex Club. IK sold its stake in April 1995 via listing on the Stockholm Stock Exchange. At the end of the nineties the trademark Fix was acquired, with colourful kids’ wear.

The beginning of the 21st century was characterized by huge international expansion. Lindex looked east and started its expansion in Central Europe and opened stores in the Baltic States, the Czech Republic and Slovakia. In 2007 the Finnish listed company Stockmann became the new owner of Lindex and with their help the Russian market opened up for Lindex. In 2008 Lindex opened its first store in St Petersburg and the following year the first Lindex store in Moscow was opened. In 2009 Lindex opened its first store in Slovakia. During the 2010s Lindex continues to focus on Central Europe. Stores are opened in Prague and Bratislava. Lindex is now one of Europe's largest fashion chains with approximately 480 stores and a turnover of 650 MEUR.

== Organisation ==
=== Stockmann ===
Since December 2007 Lindex is part of the Finnish Stockmann group that is listed on NASDAQ Helsinki, now named Lindex group. Stockmann has its head office in Helsinki.

=== Lindex board of directors ===
- Chairman Lauri Veijalainen, CEO Stockmann
- Eva Hamilton, Senior Advisor Arholma landsort, former CEO SVT
- Rossana Mariano, CEO and founder RMPR
- Tracy Stone Munn, Global Sales Director L.K Bennet
- Susanne Najafi, Entrepreneur and founder BackingMinds
- Employee Representatives: Caroline Kull Magnusson and Ann-Britt Neckvall
- Deputies: Clary Erenman and Cecilia Dahlström

=== Head office ===
Lindex head office is located in Gothenburg, where approximately 400 people work in buying, design, marketing, IT, communication, human resources, finance, logistics and distribution. Their distribution center and warehouse is currently situated in Alingsås.

=== Stores ===
Lindex is one of Europe's leading fashion chains with approximately 480 stores in 18 markets and Lindex Shop Online available in 32 countries.

=== Country office ===
Lindex has country offices in Sweden, Norway, Finland, the Czech Republic, The Baltics and England. Country offices are responsible for the results and store operations, but also that the Lindex concept is realized in the stores.

=== Production ===
Lindex does not own any factories, instead they work with independent suppliers and factories around the world. Lindex has production offices in the main production markets - China, Hong Kong, Bangladesh, India and Turkey.

Lindex offers women's wear, kids’ wear, lingerie and cosmetics.

=== Women’s wear ===
Lindex women's wear assortment is definied by Scandinavian design where inclusiveness, fit and comfort are key. Lindex also has a cosmetic brand (Lindex beauty) and an assortment with maternity wear and a range of accessories.

=== Female Engineering ===
Female engineering is a femtech brand by Lindex. In their product range one can find period panties, menopause clothes and products for maternity and post-partum.

=== Lingerie ===
Lindex started as a lingerie store in Alingsås, Sweden. The company is the market leader of lingerie in Scandinavia. In addition to the wide assortment Lindex also has the lingerie collections Ella M and So.U and offer socks, hosiery, nightwear and swimwear.

=== Kids’ wear ===
Lindex is the market leader in kids’ wear in Sweden. Lindex works with a wide assortment consisting of tops and bottoms, outerwear, nightwear, underwear, swimwear and various types of accessories. The collections are created in three groups: Newborn collection in sizes 44-86, toddlers in sizes 92 -122, and sizes 128-170 for the oldest children.

== Omni ==
Lindex started Shop Online in Sweden in 2007. In 2010 the Shop online was launched for Finland and 2011 it was launched in Norway and all EU countries.

== Designer collaborations ==
- 2009-2011 Ewa Larsson
- 2010 Narciso Rodriguez
- 2011 Rachel Zoe - stylist collaboration
- 2012 Missoni
- 2013 Matthew Williamson
- 2014 Jean Paul Gaultier
- 2019 By Malina
- 2020 Emma von Brömssen
- 2021 Emilia Ilke
- 2022 Hanna Wendelbo

== Models ==
- 2005 Emma Wiklund
- 2007 Izabella Scorupco
- 2007 Alec Wek
- 2007 Mini Andén
- 2008 Caroline Winberg
- 2010-2011 Carmen Kass
- 2011 Reese Witherspoon
- 2012 Gwyneth Paltrow
- 2013 Penélope Cruz
- 2014 Kate Hudson
- 2014 Karen Elson
- 2016 Sienna Mieller
- 2016 Ashley Graham

== See also ==
- List of Swedish companies
