= Academic Bookstore =

Finnish chain of bookstores

- Industry: Bookstore
- Founded: 1893
- Founder: Alvar Renqvist; Gösta Branders
- Headquarters: Helsinki
- Revenue: 16 million euros (approximately) in 2024
- Parent: Bonnier

The Academic Bookstore (Finnish: Akateeminen Kirjakauppa, Swedish: Akademiska bokhandeln) is a Finnish chain of bookstores. It has both physical outlets and an online presence.

Stockmann sold the chain in 2015 to Bonnier Group. Originally founded as an independent chain, it was bought out by Stockmann in 1930. Its revenue in 2015 was about 40 million euros.

== History ==
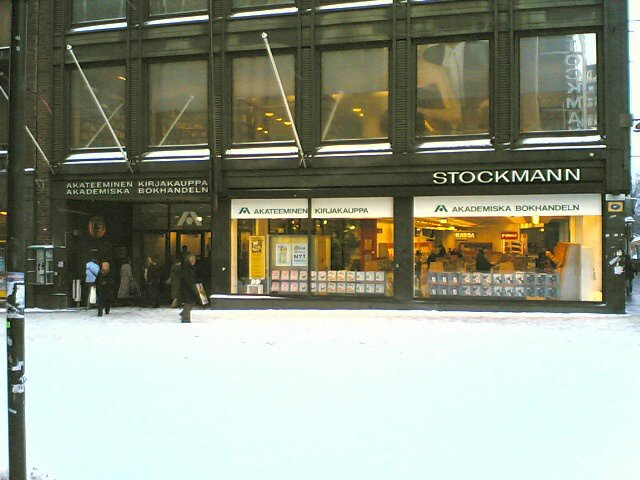
The Academic Bookstore in Helsinki.

The Academic Bookstore was founded in 1893 by a group that included Alvar Renqvist and Gösta Branders. Its goal was "to serve equally the needs of researchers and the general public, and which, fairly looking after the interests of domestic publishing, working to establish faster and more secure links with the foreign book market". The first store was located on Aleksanterinkatu in Helsinki.

In 1901, the bookstore moved to a new location on the same street to accommodate a simultaneous inventory of 1,200 titles, followed by another relocation in 1910.

Stockmann acquired the Academic Bookstore in 1930 and moved it to the new Stockmann department store at Helsinki centre. In 1969, a new 2,000 m^{2} (22,000 sq ft) location was established, where it still remains, at the Alvar Aalto-designed Kirjatalo.

The Academic Bookstore was part of the Info bookstore chain from 1978 to 1985. An electronic magazine ordering system was set up in 1975. In 1984 its sales were computerized.

Previously the chain has operated at Lahti (1971–1983), Jyväskylä (1983–1997), Joensuu (1992–1997), Lappeenranta (1980–1997), Kuopio (1996–1997) and Vaasa (1996–1997) with the intention of operating in all Finnish cities with higher education. These stores were transferred to Suomalainen Kirjakauppa in 1998. Instead, Stockmann decided to focus on cities with its department stores.

In 2015, Stockmann sold the chain to the Swedish Bonnier Group. In January 2026, Adlibris acquired the Academic Bookstore from Bonnier to merge Adlibris's digital infrastructure with the chain's physical retail footprint.

== Retail outlets ==
The Academic Bookstore currently has five stores. One is in Helsinki (the flagship store in the city centre, while the others are in Tapiola (opened in 1990), Tampere (1983) and Turku (1982–).

Previous locations included Joensuu, Jyväskylä (twice), Kuopio, Lahti, Lappeenranta, Oulu, Vaasassa and Vantaa (closed in 2019).

The webstore has been open since 1999.
