= Stockmann =

Finnish retailer

Stockmann plc

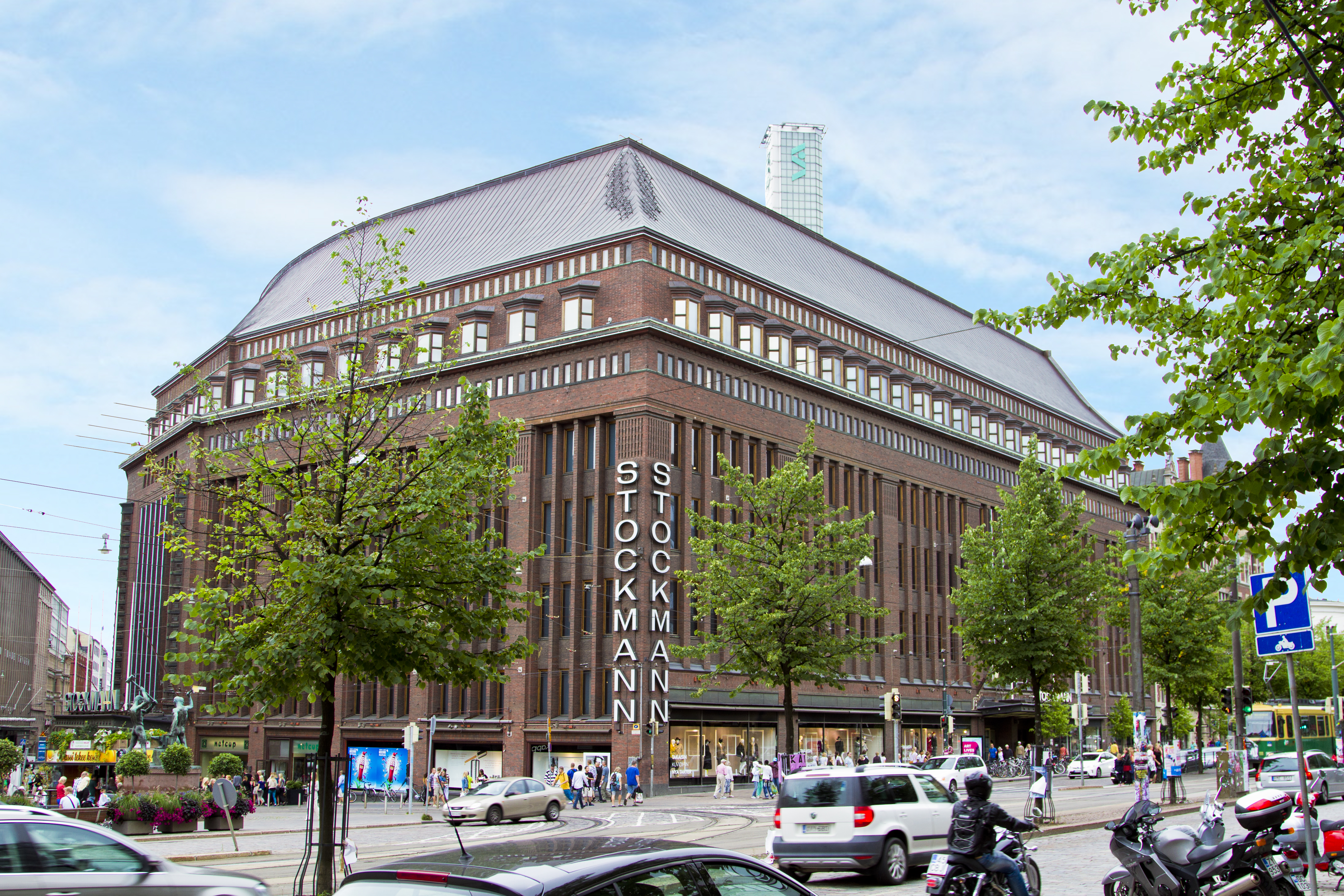
- The flagship Stockmann department store in downtown Helsinki, Finland
- Trade name: Stockmann
- Native name: Lindex Group Oyj
- Type: Public company
- Traded as: Nasdaq Helsinki: STCBV
- ISIN: FI0009000251
- Industry: Retail
- Founded: 1862; 164 years ago in Helsinki, Finland
- Founder: Heinrich Georg Franz Stockmann
- Headquarters: Helsinki, Finland
- Area served: Finland, Latvia, Estonia
- Key people: Susanne Ehnbåge; CEO
- Products: Department store
- Brands: Stockmann, Stockmann Herkku, Lindex, One Way
- Number of employees: 9,734 (2016)
- Website: www.lindex-group.com

Stockmann plc is a Finnish retailer established in 1862.

Stockmann's seven company-owned department stores are in Finland (five), Estonia (one), and Latvia (one). There also were an additional 29 Stockmann-branded department stores in Russia owned and operated by Reviva Holdings, with a license to use the Stockmann name until 2028.

The Stockmann, Helsinki centre flagship store covers 50,000 square metres (540,000 sq ft) of retail space and welcomes more than 17 million visitors every year. It is the largest department store in the Nordic countries.

Stockmann owns and manages five shopping malls with 142,000 square metres (1,530,000 sq ft) of gross leasable area, of which half is occupied by Stockmann.

Lindex, owned by Stockmann, has 475 stores in 16 countries, including 39 franchised stores.

Stockmann has been a member of the International Association of Department Stores from 1950 to 2020, with various CEOs acting as presidents of the Association over time.

== History ==
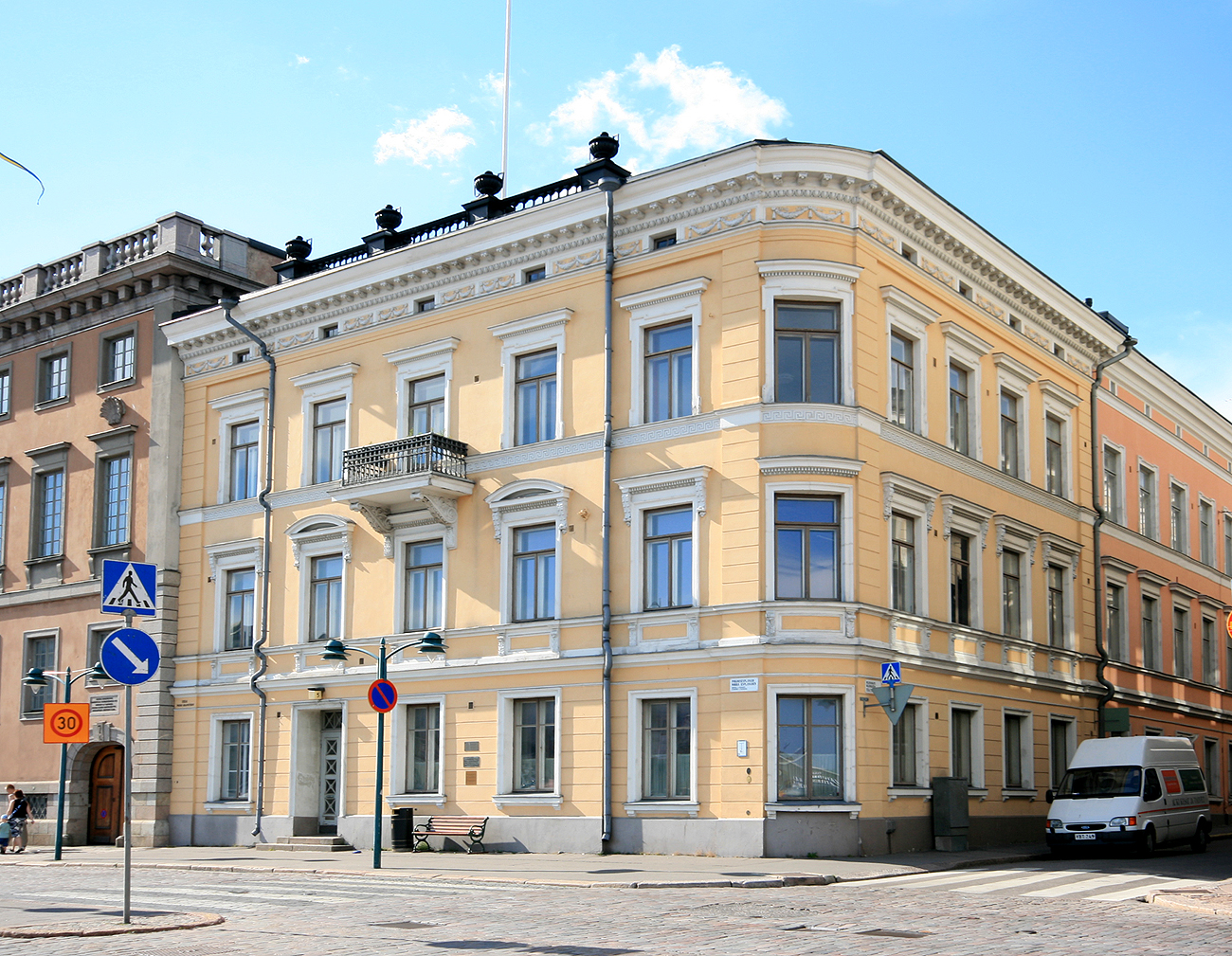
Stockmann's first department store was located at Pohjoisesplanadi 5.

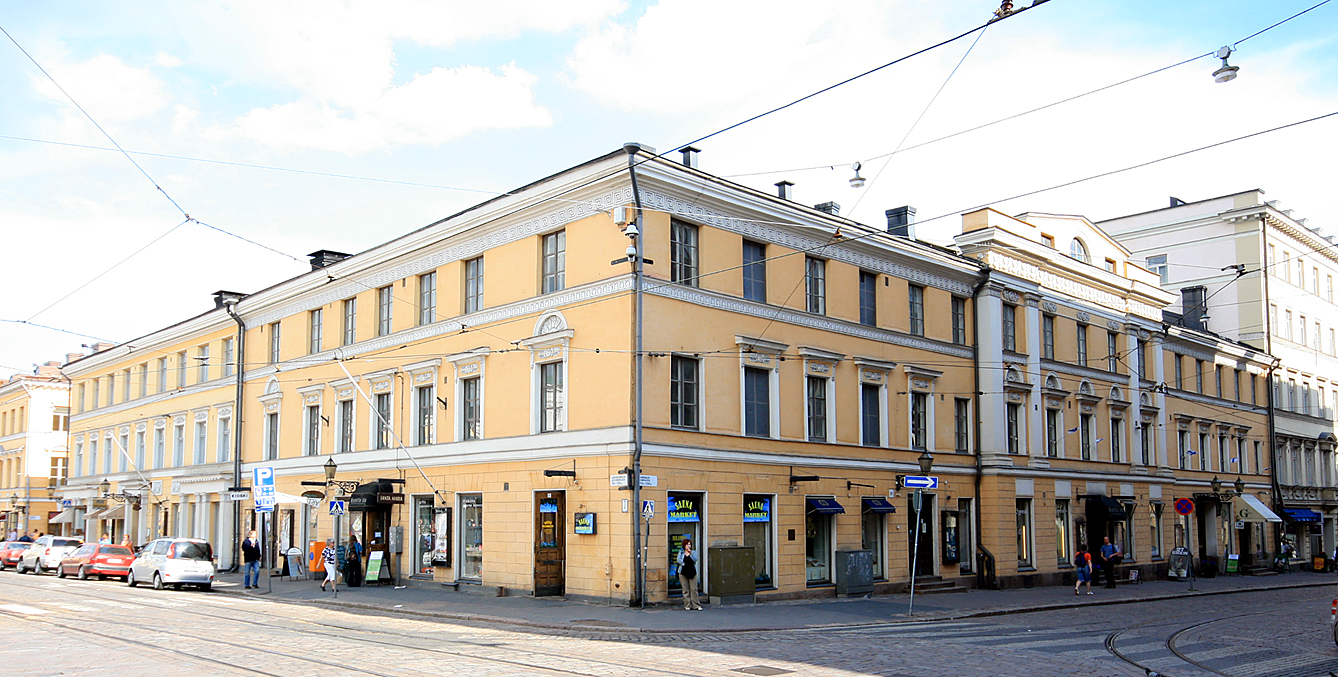
Stockmann's department store at Kiseleff Bazar, Aleksanterinkatu 28, Helsinki.

Heinrich Georg Franz Stockmann became the manager of the store in 1859. In 1862, Stockmann took control of the store and the Stockmann department store was officially established.

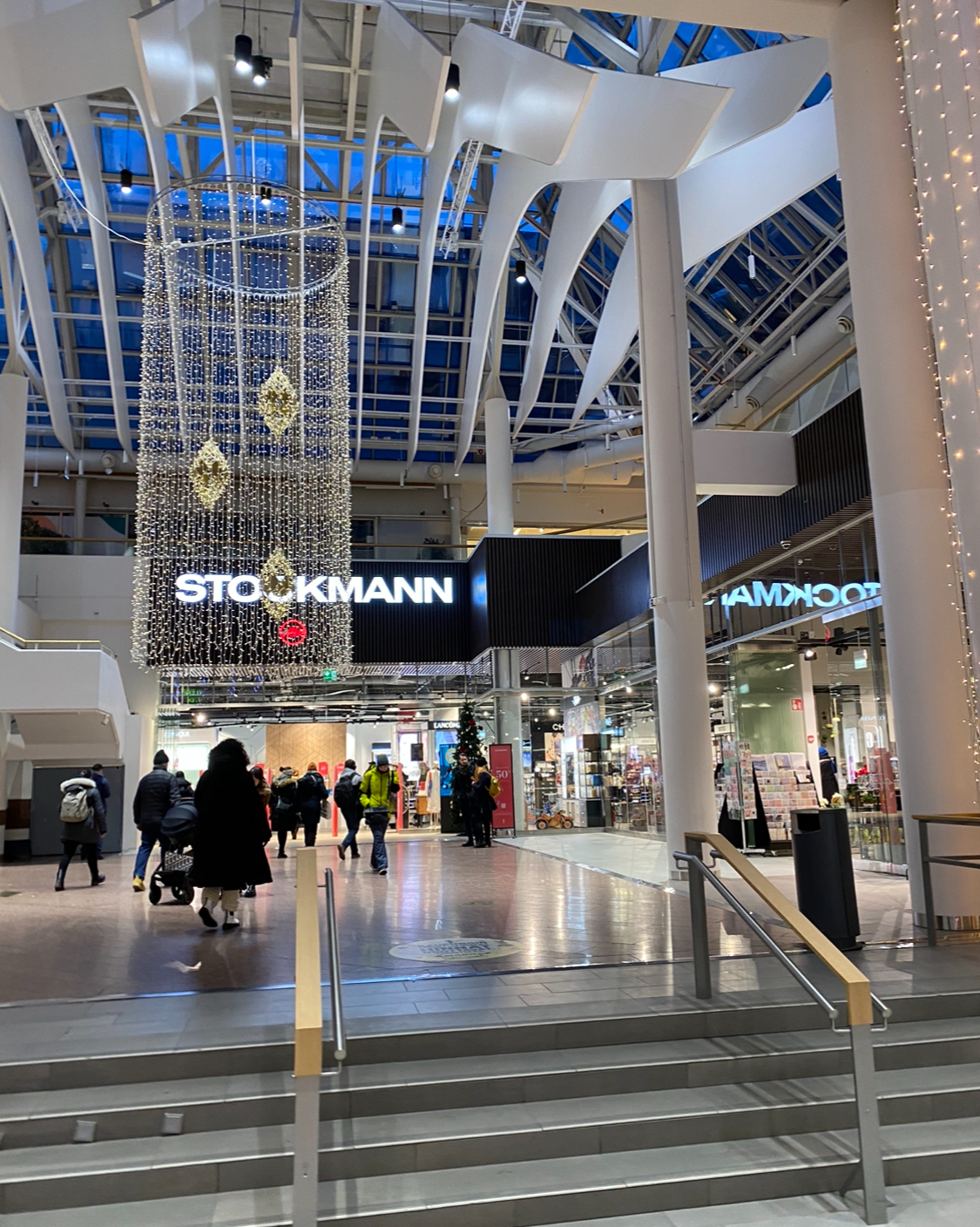
Stockmann in Turku.

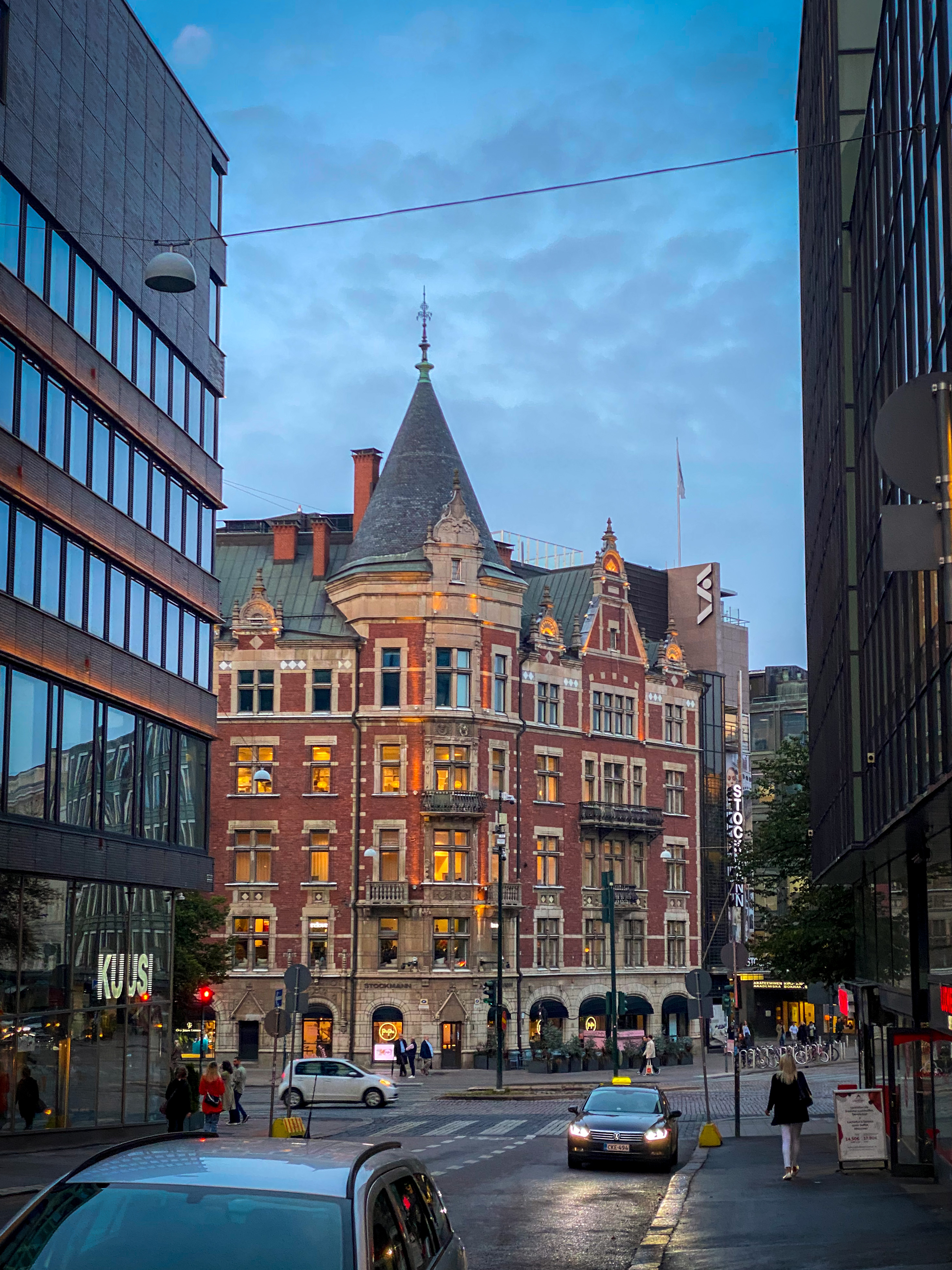
Stockmann's Argos building in Helsinki.

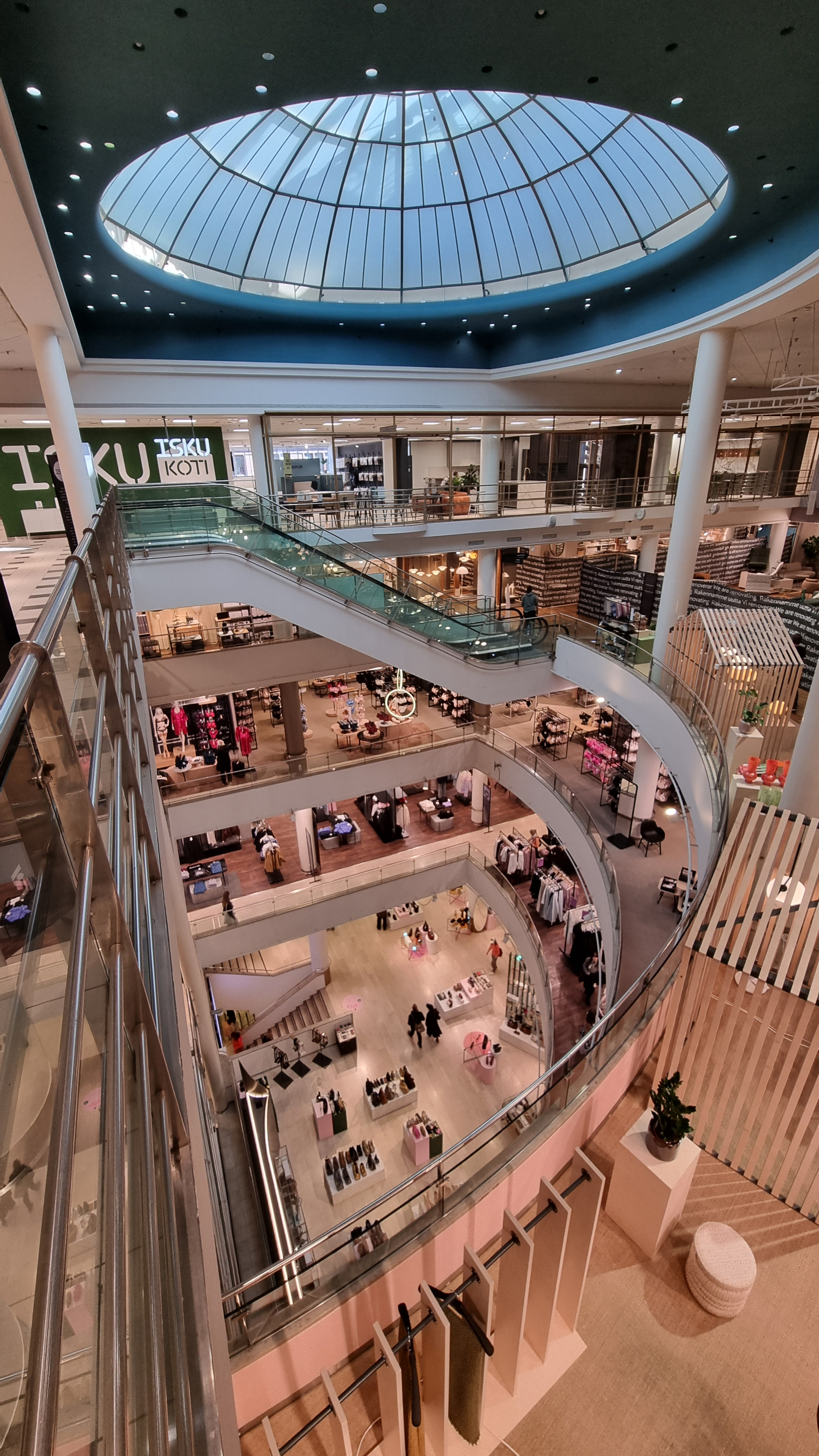
Argos atrium in August 2025.

In 1930, Stockmann bought a neighbouring book store, Akateeminen kirjakauppa (Swedish: Akademiska bokhandeln, the Academic Bookstore). The first television transmission in Finland was broadcast from the department store in 1950.

In the 1950s, Stockmann opened a department store in Tampere. Stockmann expanded its operations to other Finnish cities. The company subsequently opened department stores in Tapiola in 1981 and Turku in 1982. Stockmann's first stores outside of Finland opened in Moscow in 1989 and in Tallinn in 1993.

Stockmann opened a department store in Helsinki's Itis Shopping Centre in 1992.

In December 2007, Stockmann acquired Lindex, a Swedish clothing retailer with 331 outlets in the Nordic region and the Baltic states.

Stockmann had a total of four department stores in Moscow until January 31, 2015. One was located in the Metropolis shopping centre in the city centre, and the other three were in Mega shopping centres in different parts of Moscow: Mega South, Mega North, and Mega East. In addition, there had previously been a department store on Smolenskaya, but it was closed before this time.

In 2010, the British newspaper The Independent, in its Sunday edition, reported speculation among market-watchers in London that British department store Debenhams was considering an acquisition of Stockmann. However, Stockmann publicly denied the rumors, stating that they were entirely fictional.

== Strategy ==
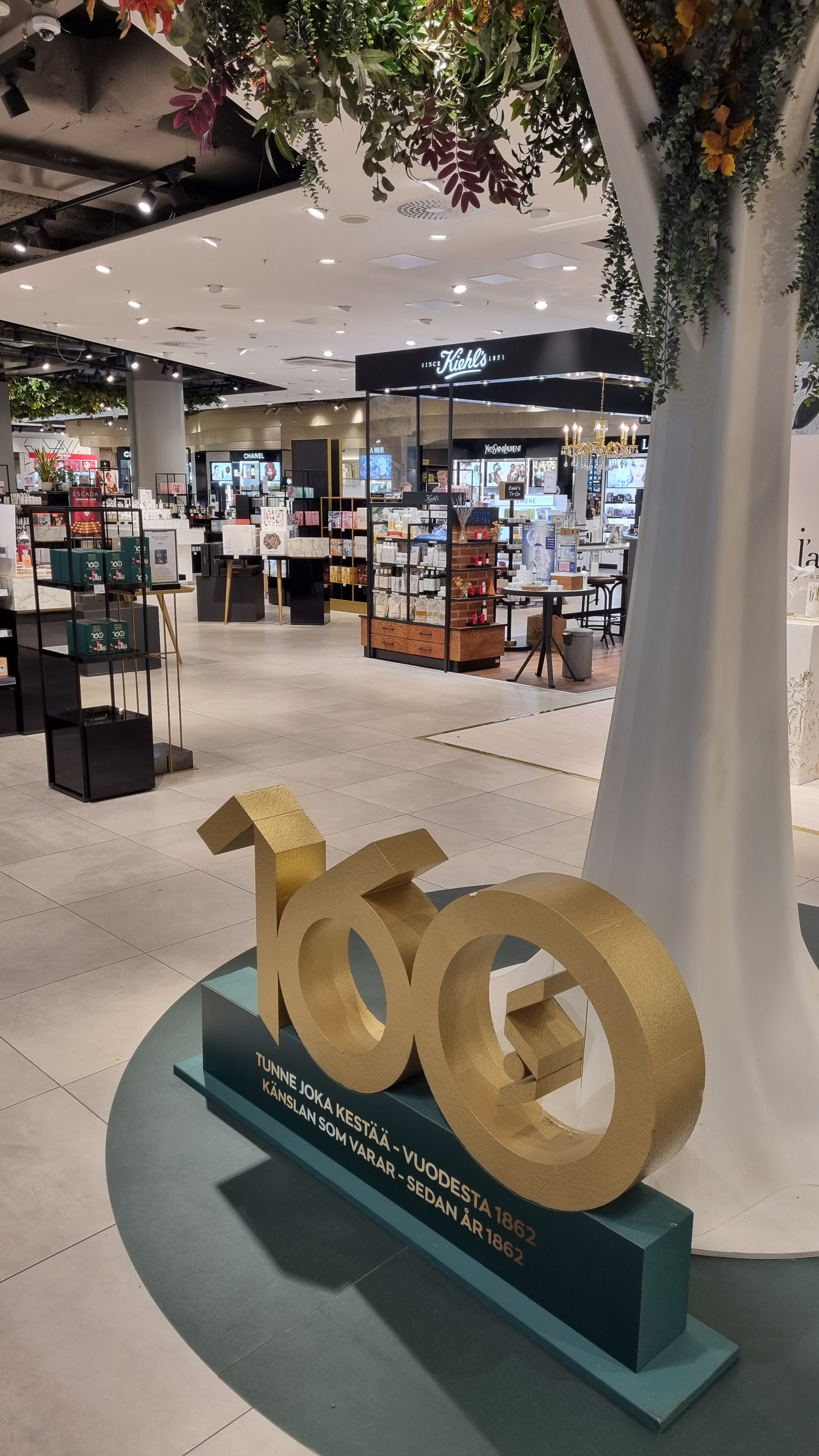
Stockmann at Ainoa Shopping Centre in Tapiola, Espoo.

In 2014, the Stockmann Group was a diversified retail company. Stockmann had invested heavily in the Russian market, but the Ukrainian crisis that began in 2014 caused the rouble to collapse, creating difficulties for the business.

In addition to the challenges from the Russian market, increasing competition in the retail sector and the growing popularity of online shopping created difficulties in the Finnish market. Stockmann's management began to cut non-essential operations, leaving only department stores in major Finnish cities and Baltic countries, and Lindex.

Stockmann sold Seppälä on 1 April 2015 to Seppälä's CEO Eveliina Melentjeff and her husband Timo Melentjeff. In September 2015, Stockmann sold The Academic Bookstore to Bonnier Books AB media. In February 2016, Stockmann sold its operations in Russia to Reviva Holdings. Stockmann continued to own and operate Nevsky Centre in Saint Petersburg until it was sold in January 2019. On January 1, 2017, Stockmann sold Hobby Hall to SGN Group. In 2017, the company sold its food division, Stockmann Herkku, to S Group for €27 million. In May 2018, the company sold Kirjatalo, the building opposite their flagship store in Helsinki which houses the Academic Bookstore, for €108 million. In March 2019, CEO Lauri Veijalainen resigned. In June 2019, the company announced 150 layoffs. In April 2020, Stockmann applied for corporate restructuring due to the COVID-19 pandemic in Finland. Its restructuring plan took effect in December 2020 over an eight-year period. The department store's lease ended at Itäkeskus in August 2025. Lindex Group did not renew the lease with Itäkeskus.

Stockmann opened a new department store in Tapiola, Espoo in March 2017. Stockmann appointed Lauri Ratia as Chairman of the Board in 2019.

== Operations in Russia ==
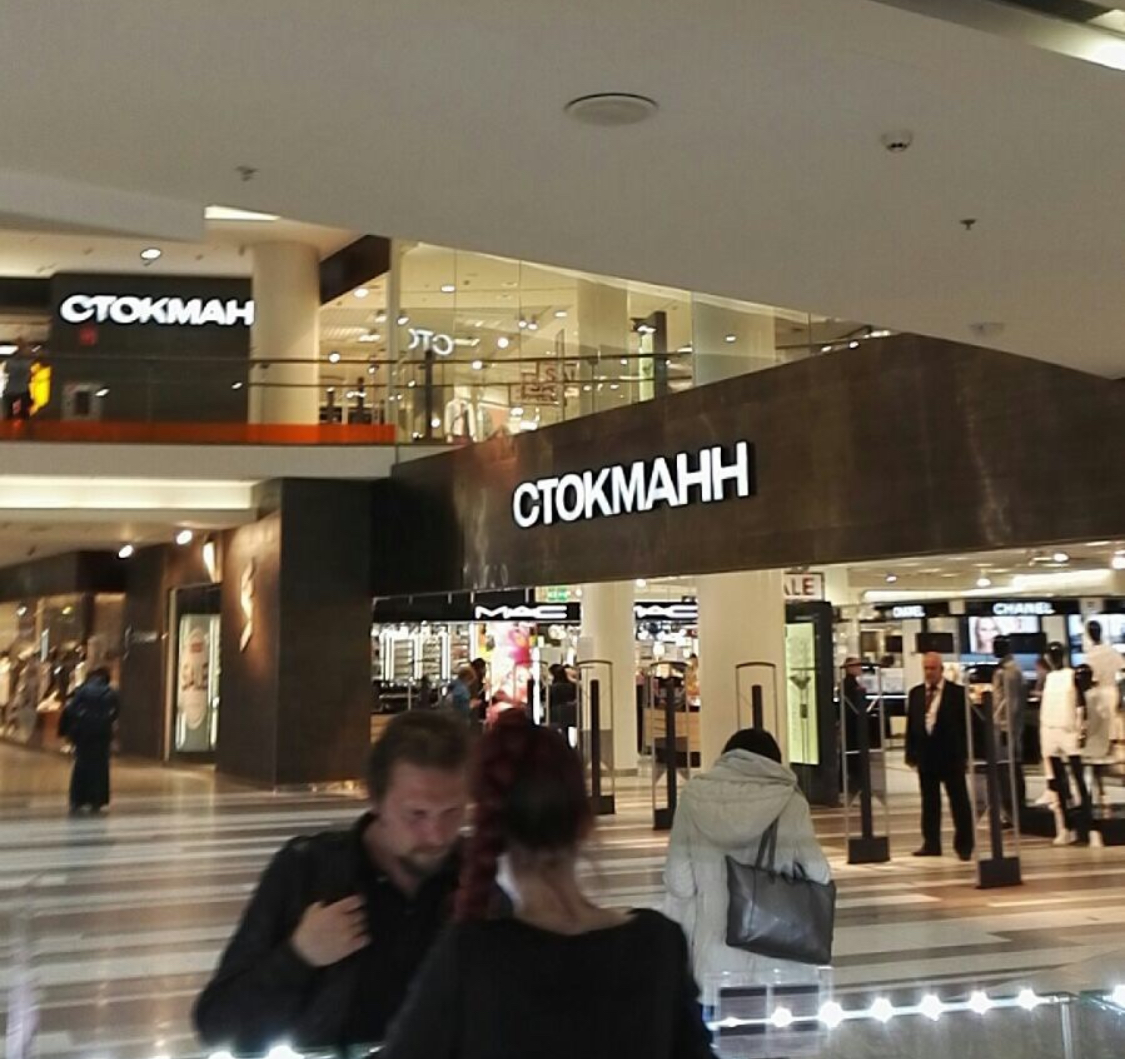
Stockmann in Saint Petersburg.

Stockmann Group withdrew from the Russian market in 2019. Stockmann signed a license agreement with Reviva Holdings Limited in 2016, which authorizes the use of the Stockmann brand in Russia. The license agreement was extended in 2019 and is valid until 2028. In 2023, Reviva announced that the company will open 20 new Stockmann department stores in Russia.

In January 2022, Sberbank and Yakov Panchenko, actual owner of Stockmann in Russia, announced the binding agreement for the purchase of 100% stake of Stockmann by the bank by June 2022. Presently, 100% of shares of Stockmann in Russia are hypothecated by "Sberbank".

== Current operations ==
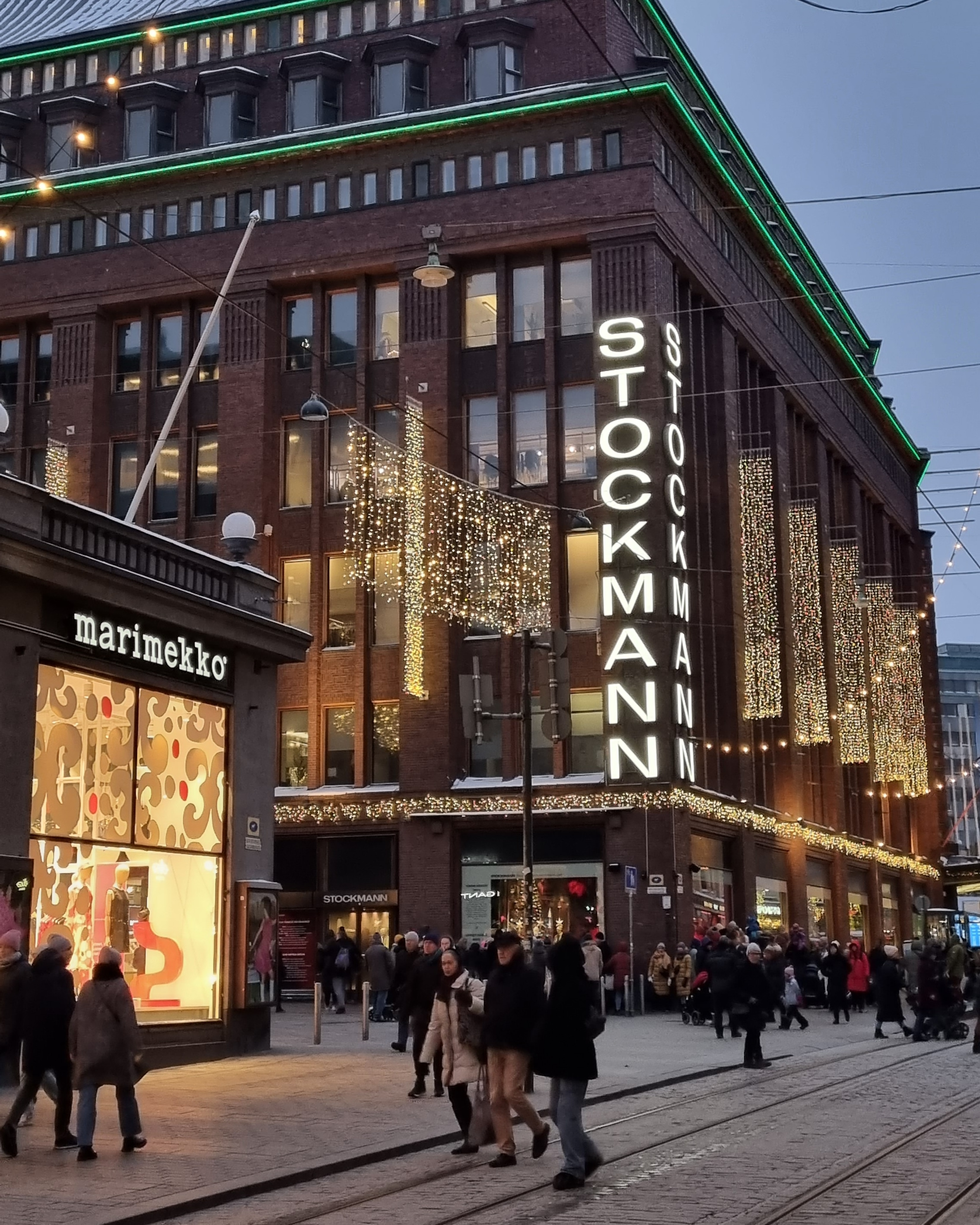
Stockmann in Helsinki.

As of 2025, Stockmann in Finland operates as a marketplace known for its department stores. The flagship Stockmann department store is located in the heart of Helsinki at Aleksanterinkatu 52, covering over 50,000 square meters across ten floors.

Stockmann has a total of seven department stores spread across Finland and the Baltic countries, with locations in major Finnish cities such as Helsinki (also in Jumbo shopping centre and Ainoa shopping center in the metropolitan area), Turku, and Tampere, as well as department stores in Riga and Tallinn. Additionally, Stockmann operates an online store, stockmann.com.

Stockmann is part of the Lindex Group plc, listed on Nasdaq Helsinki.

== Locations ==
=== Finland ===
- Helsinki City Center, Stockmann's oldest and largest flagship store
- Jumbo shopping centre, Vantaa
- Ainoa shopping centre, Tapiola, Espoo
- Tampere
- Turku, Hansa shopping centre

=== Estonia and Latvia ===
- Tallinn, Estonia
- Riga, Latvia

=== Russia (under license) ===
- Saint Petersburg, Russia
- Moscow, Russia
- Kazan, Russia
- Yekaterinburg, Russia
- Krasnoyarsk, Russia
- Murmansk, Russia
- Sochi, Russia
- Khabarovsk, Russia
- Perm, Russia
- Novosibirsk, Russia
- Irkutsk, Russia
