= Rautatalo =

Office building in Helsinki, Finland, designed by Alvar Aalto

- Rautatalo / Järnhuset
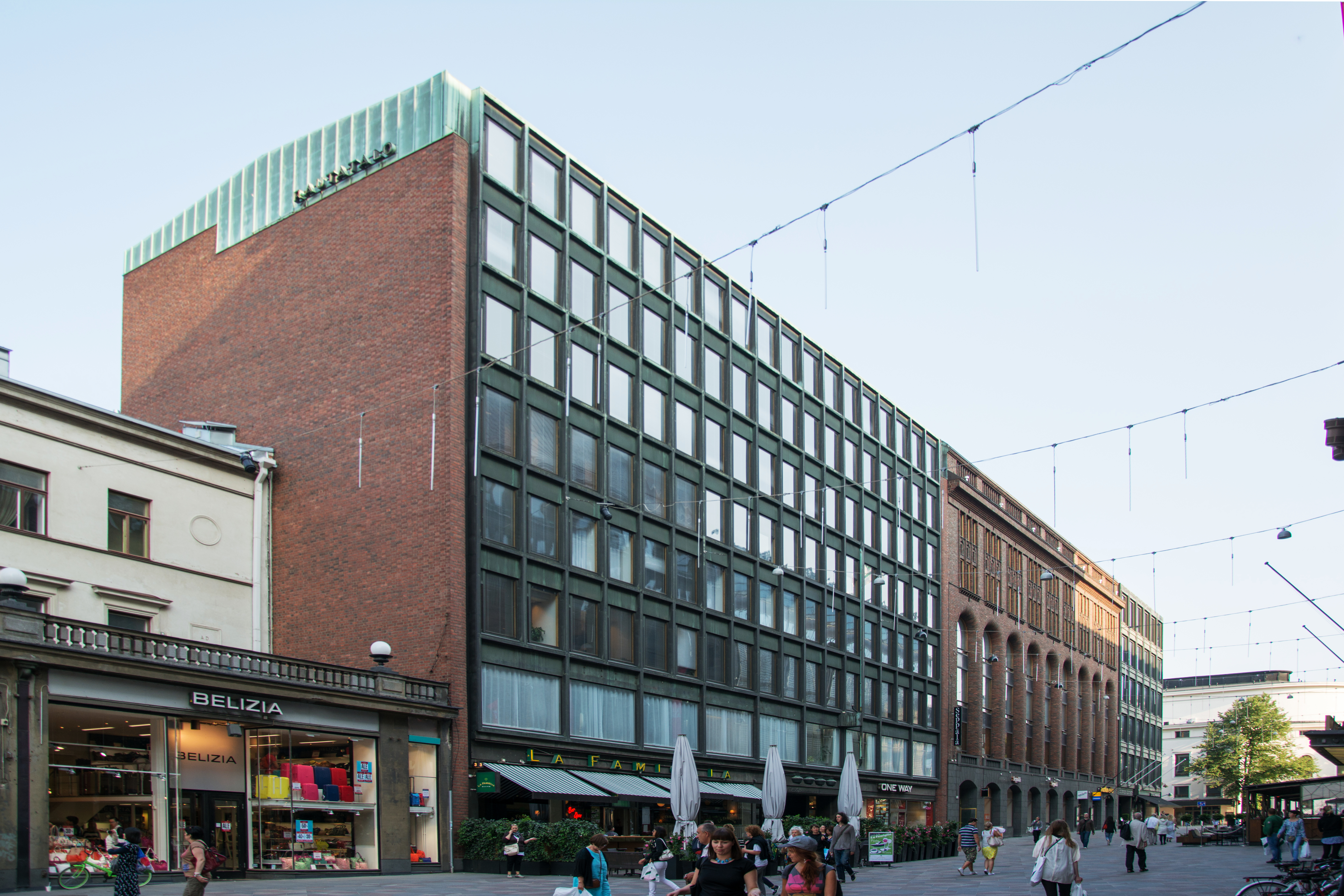
- Rautatalo pictured in 2013
- Interactive map of the Rautatalo area

General information
- Type: Office
- Architectural style: Post-war modernism
- Location: Helsinki, Finland
- Coordinates: 60.168417°N 24.943056°E
- Completed: 1955

Design and construction
- Architect: Alvar Aalto

Rautatalo (Swedish: Järnhuset) is an office building in central Helsinki, Finland, completed in 1955, and notable for having been designed by the Finnish architect Alvar Aalto.

The building is based on Aalto's winning entry, Casa, to a 1951 design contest. It was commissioned for the Finnish Hardware Association, after which it is named: Rautatalo literally translates as 'Iron House' or 'Iron Building'; hardware stores in Finnish being called rautakauppa ('iron shop', compare with 'ironmongers').

The exterior character of the building is dark and austere, clad with copper plate on its main façade and brown brick on the side elevation. It was designed to match the height and proportions of the earlier building, created in classical style by Eliel Saarinen, which it abuts on one side (seen in the photo on the right).

In contrast to the exterior, the interior is light and airy, making extensive use of white Carrara marble and travertine. At the heart of the interior space is an enclosed atrium, naturally-lit through 40 skylights, known as Marmoripiha ('Marble Courtyard'), with its design inspired by Mediterranean architecture.

The lower floors house retail premises, including a café in the atrium space, with offices located on the upper floors.

The building's exterior and much of its interior features have protected status.

Interior
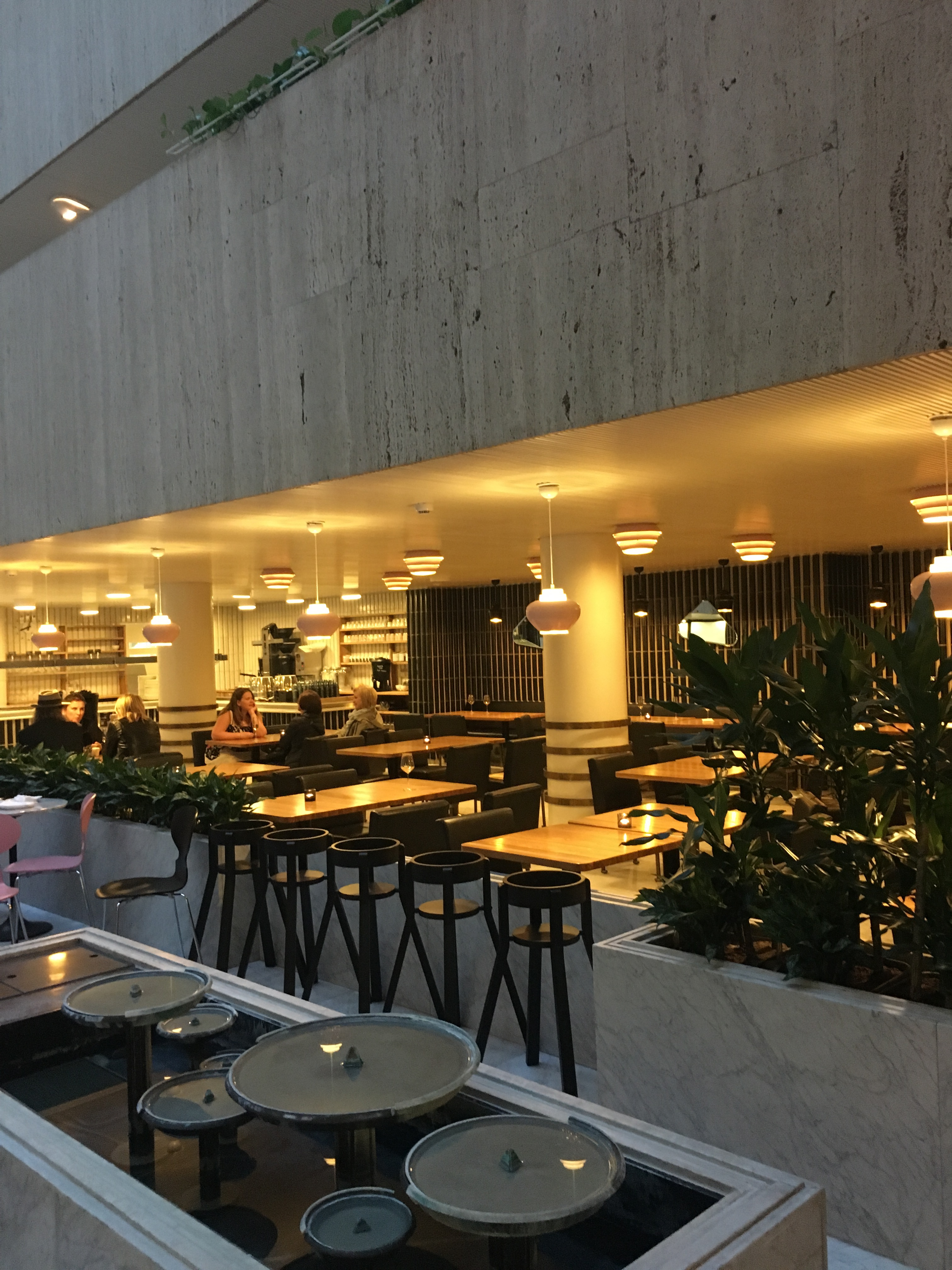
Rautatalo atrium café

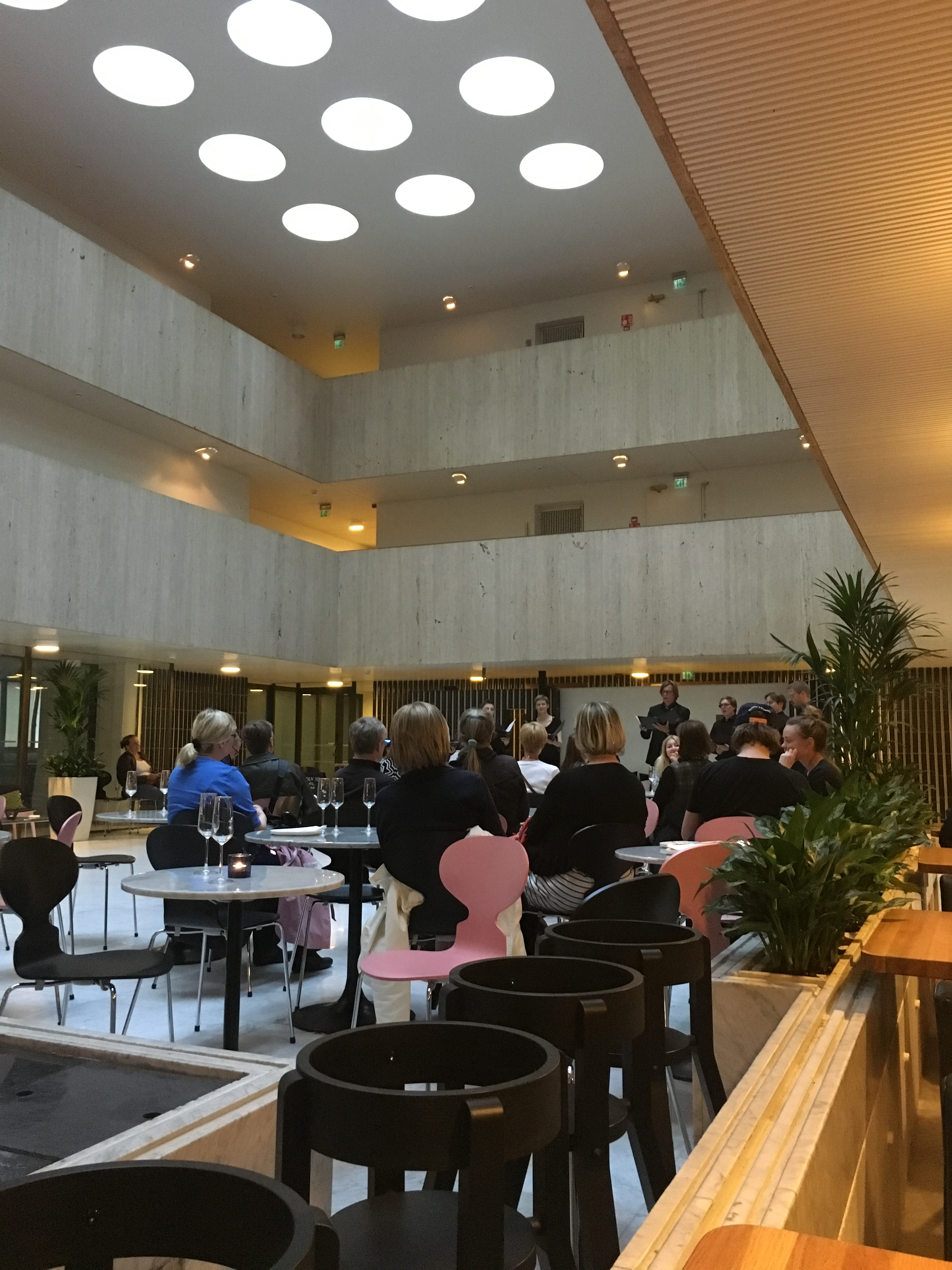
Atrium ceiling with barrel skylights
