= Espoo Cultural Centre =

Cultural centre in Espoo, Finland

Coordinates: 60°10′40″N 024°48′16″E

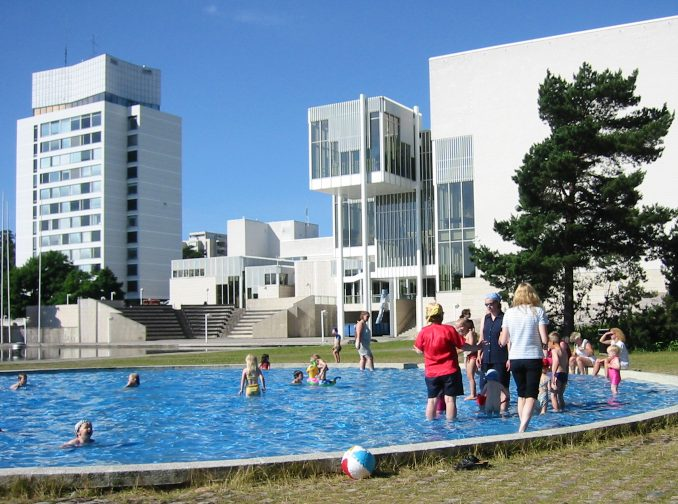
The Espoo Cultural Centre in the summer

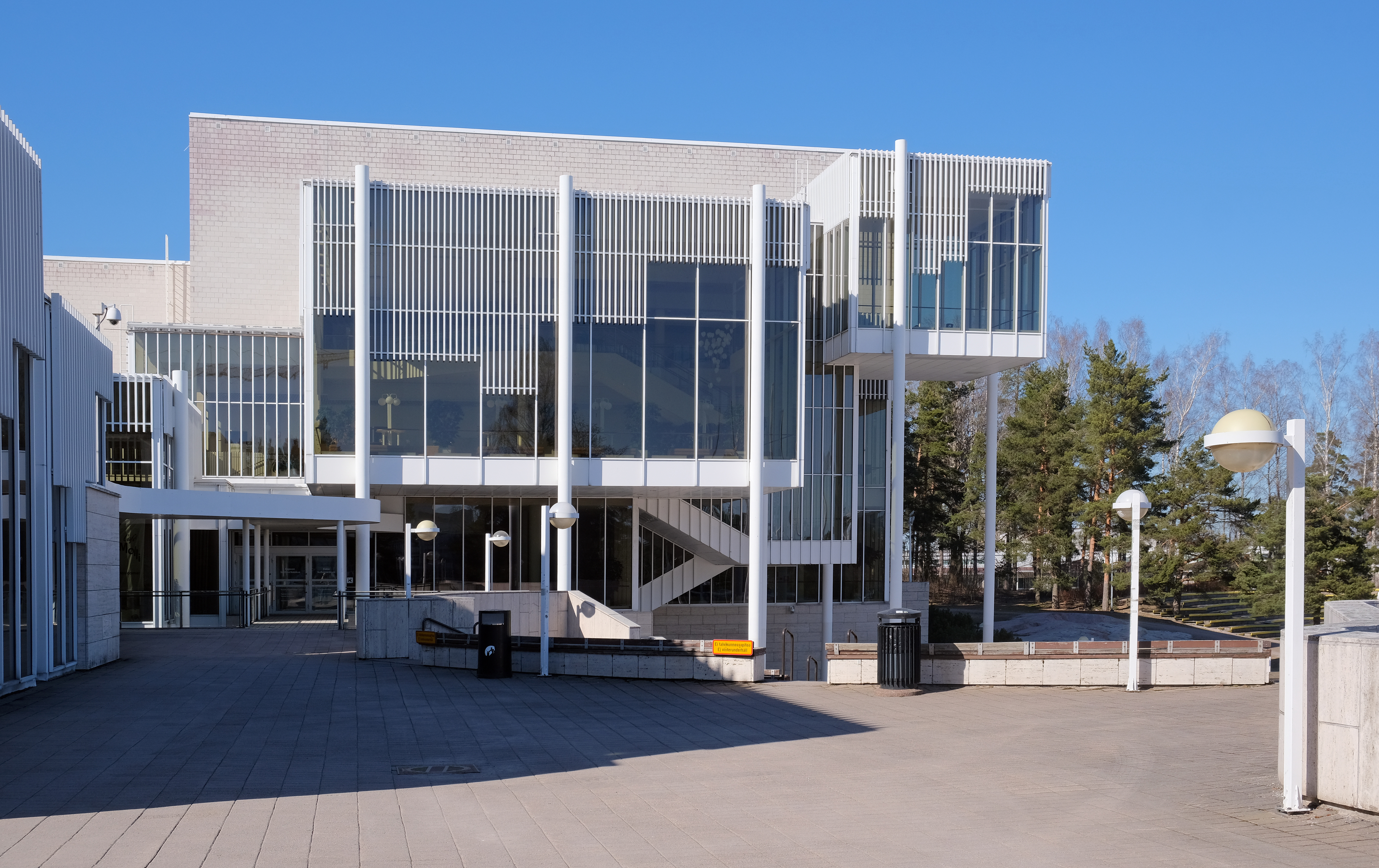
The Espoo Cultural Centre seen from the south

The Espoo Cultural Centre (Finnish: Espoon kulttuurikeskus; Swedish: Esbo kulturcentrum) is a culture centre in Tapiola, Espoo, Finland. It is most famous for hosting the central library of Tapiola. Near the culture centre is the Tapiola swimming pool and the Tapiola Garden hotel.

The Espoo Cultural Centre hosts arts events, hosts activities to further culture in Espoo, offers cultural and public services, and hosts parties, meetings, fairs, and private events. The cultural centre houses the Espoo musical academy, the Espoo city orchestra Tapiola Sinfonietta, the Tapiola library, the Espoo city cultural office, the Tapiola general service point, and the Espoo folk high school. Among others, the Espoo city theatre, April Jazz, the Espoo Ciné film festival, the Espoo international piano week and KuoroEspoo have hosted events in the Espoo cultural centre. According to the web page of the city of Espoo, the cultural centre is "the main stage for performing arts and cultural life in Espoo".

The Espoo cultural centre is located next to the Tapiola Central Tower, between the cultural square and the central pool. The building was designed by the architect Arto Sipinen and was completed in 1989. The building has two halls: Louhisali, with 300 seats, suitable for theatre, and Tapiolasali, with 800 seats, suitable for concerts.

== Sources ==
- Kulttuurikeskus, City of Espoo.
