= Heikki von Hertzen =

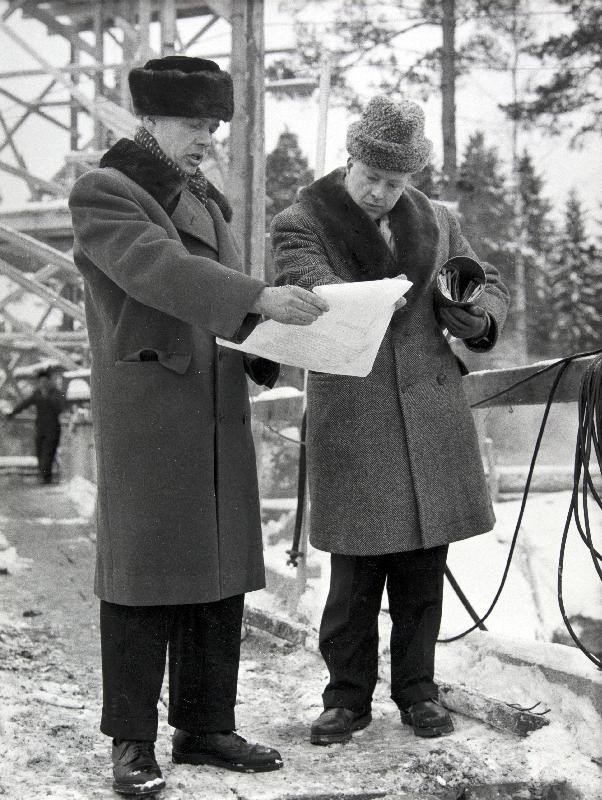
Heikki von Hertzen (left) and Jorma Aaltonen (right) laying the foundation stone of Tapiola City in December 1958

Heikki Olavi Frithiof von Hertzen (born 21 November 1913 in Vyborg, Grand Duchy of Finland - died 10 April 1985 in Fuengirola, Spain) was the chief of operations at Väestöliittto and a residential political influencer who was active in designing the garden city of Tapiola in Espoo, Finland. In 1948 Hertzen suggested the founding of the Arava board to the government and was present and planning the Finnish Residential Foundation, where he served as chairman of the board from 1951 to 1976. Hertzen was a jurist by education; he graduated from his studies of law in 1940 and was given the title of varatuomari in 1947.

== Influence on construction and communal planning ==
=== Birth of Arava ===
After the wars in Finland from 1939 to 1945, as the lack of apartments was at its worst, von Hertzen and Väinö Pitkänen, the general secretary of the Central Council of Tenants, calculated there was need for 60 thousand new apartments. In 1948 they suggested to the government there should be funding for new apartments to found the Arava board to fix the difficult apartment situation. Hertzen was elected to the three-member committee to oversee the Arava board plans, which managed to come up with a new law in a rapid pace of only three months in the next year.

=== Thoughts about urban construction ===
Väestöliitto was founded in 1941 and von Hertzen started as its chief of operations in 1943. Before this, he had served as the director of a small side office of a bank in Tampere. In Väestöliitto, von Hertzen became acquainted with Yrjö Laine-Juva, who was a member of the board. Hertzen and Laine-Juva systematically researched the environment of Helsinki to find out the best places for construction. They were later joined by Yrjö Harvia, the CEO of Kaupunkiliitto, the architect Otto-Iivari Meurman and V. J. Sukselainen, the chairman of the board at Väestöliitto. The group presented ideas for a new type of apartment production and communal structure.

The idea of a garden city in Finland was created by von Hertzen. He presented his ideas of urban construction in Väestöliitto's 1946 pamphlet Koti vaiko kasarmi lapsillemme ("A home or a barracks for our children?") The book was a polemic illustration, which appealed to emotion when presenting theses for the ideal residential area. Hertzen was a vocal critic of the city blocks in Helsinki and instead presented English garden cities and new Swedish residential areas. The pamphlet was published in one thousand copies for people in charge of residential politics. Despite the small number of copies, it was of great significance. The book attracted a great deal of attention and started vivid discussion.

=== Residential Foundation and Tapiola garden city ===
In 1950 Väestöliitto started negotiations about a large land purchase in Espoo, at the lands of the Hagalund manor. Otto-Iivari Meurman had already made a zoning plan for 12 thousand people at the area, which was a lot larger than the 230 hectare area negotiated by Väestöliitto. Meurman had made his plan by commitment from Arne Grahn, the owner of the Hagalund manor, and it had been approved by the government of the province of Uusimaa in 1947. The plan was not put to production, and in 1951 the smaller core part of the area was put on sale. Von Hertzen tried to negotiate financing for the trade from various sources without success, until he finally got a loan from the company Veikkaus. The deal for the 230 hectare area was made in summer 1951, for a sum of 180 million markka. Von Hertzen co-operated with the Central Association for Tenants, the Finnish Association for Civilian and Military Disabled, the Finnish Federation of Trade Unions, the Association of Officials and the Mannerheim League for Child Welfare, together with which Väestöliitto founded the Residential Foundation to start the construction of a new garden city. Von Hertzen was chosen as chief of operations for the foundation. The first phase of construction, Itäinen lähiö ("The eastern suburb") built mainly in the early 1950 created a global reputation for Finnish urban planning. A naming competition held by Väestöliitto resulted in the name Tapiola.

=== Satellite cities of Uusimaa ===
In the early 1960s, Uusimaa commissioned a larger "Uusimaa 2010" plan based on von Hertzen's thoughts. Von Hertzen's goal was to have seven independent satellite cities for Helsinki.

=== Recognition ===
Heikki von Hertzen was awarded the title of professor in 1974 and was awarded an honorary doctorate of technology at the Helsinki University of Technology in the same year.

== Sources ==
- Mikä on Asuntosäätiö?, Helsingin Sanomat 14 April 2000. Accessed on 23 December 2007.
- Manninen, Antti: Lähiöt ja tehokkuuden yhteiskunta. Tampere: Gaudeamus, 1994. ISBN 951-662-610-6.
- Suomen lakimiehet - Finlands jurister. Helsinki: Finnish Association of Lawyers, 1982.
