= Standing Army (film) =

2010 documentary film

Standing Army is a 2010 documentary film about the global network of U.S. military bases, the impact that these have on local populations, and the military–industrial complex that lies behind it. The film was directed by Enrico Parenti and Thomas Fazi.

== Synopsis ==
The United States has 250,000 soldiers stationed on more than 700 military bases in at least 40 countries across the globe. This deployment has continued to increase.

The film explores historical displacement of native populations, including Italy, on Diego Garcia (an Indian Ocean island) and the Middle East. The film posits that while the traditional definition of the term empire means possession of colonies, the foundation of an "American empire" is based on a worldwide network of military bases. While they used to serve as simple supply facilities in war-like conflicts, they are often formed in the aftermath of armed US interventions, raising the question if this is an intentional strategy. The film presents various data and concludes with Chalmers Johnson, former CIA advisor, who claims this is a new type of imperialism containing a self-destructive recoil force that will lead to a medium-term decline and the ruin of the American position of power in the world.

== Festival screenings and awards ==
SiciliAmbiente Film Festival (winner "Best Documentary), Tekfestival (special mention "Best Photography), São Paulo International Film Festival, BAFICI, Espoo Ciné International Film Festival, DOCSDF, Istanbul International 1001 Documentary Film Festival, Festival des Libertés, DOK Leipzig, IDFA Docs for Sale, Ronda Intl Film Festival, Romania International Film Festival, Tama Cinema Forum, MEDIMED, Cine’Eco, Iasi Intl Film Festival, TUR Ostrava Film Festival, Euganea Film Festival, Est Film Festival, NoemArt Film Festival.

== TV broadcasts ==
Italy (Fox Channels), Finland (YLE), Germany (ZDFinfo), Poland (TVP Kultura), Slovenia (RTV), Russia TV, Al Jazeera.
