= Kino Tapiola =

Coordinates: 60°10′44″N 24°48′40″E

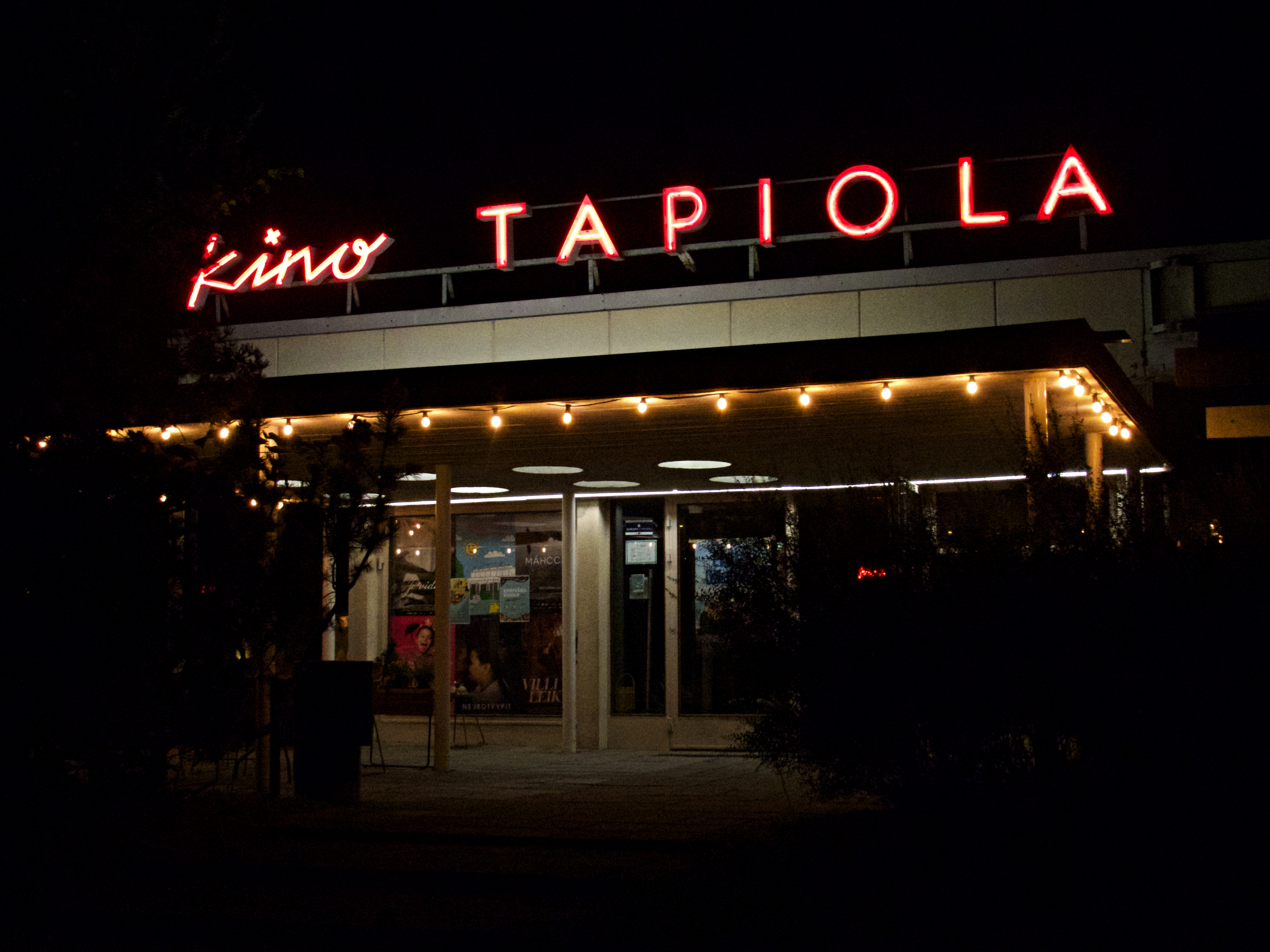
The Kino Tapiola building at night.

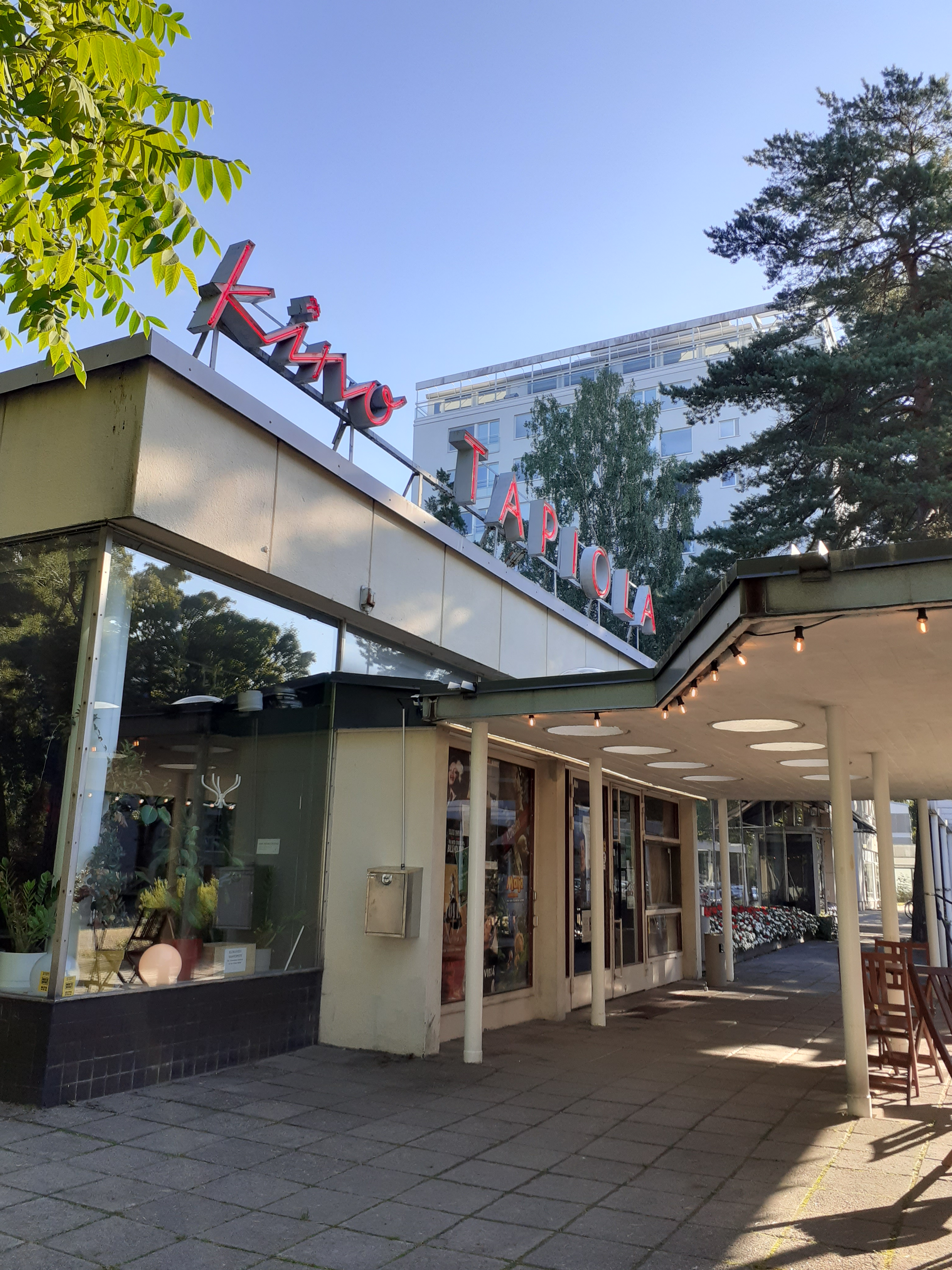
The Kino Tapiola building.

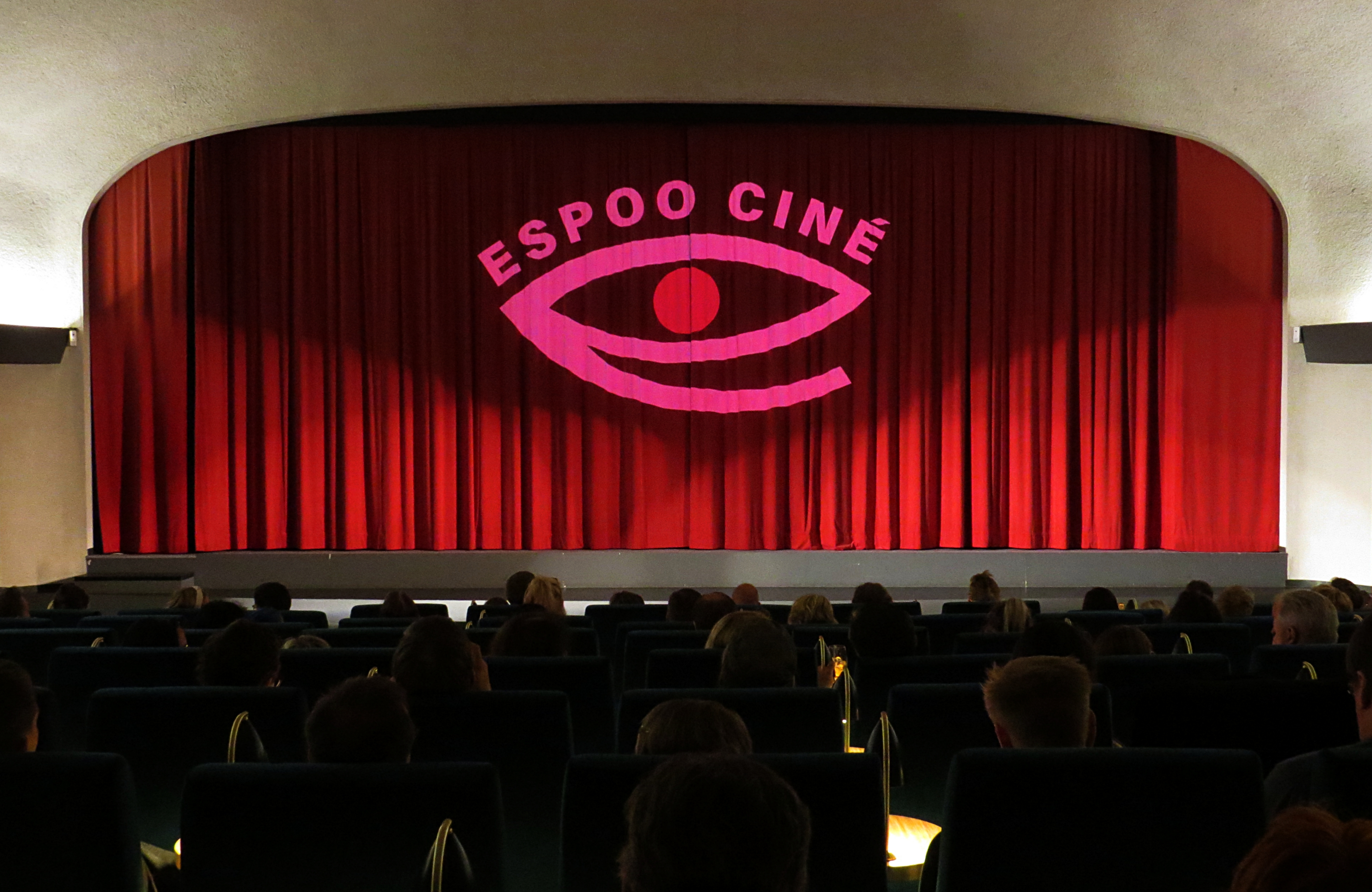
Espoo Ciné at Kino Tapiola.

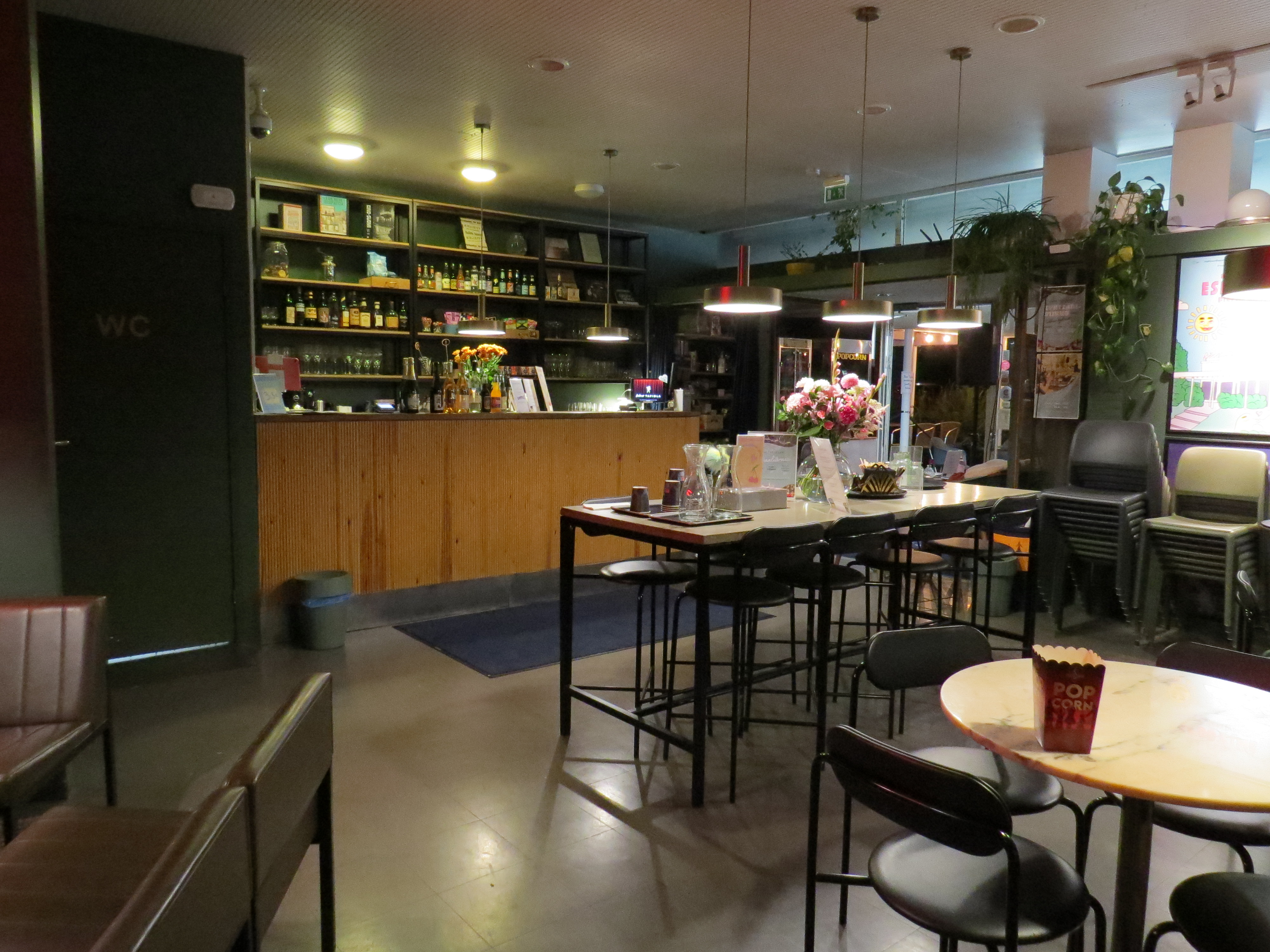
The bar and coffeeshop at Kino Tapiola.

Kino Tapiola is a movie theatre in Tapiola, Espoo, Finland, founded in 1955. The theatre is one of the few original old-style movie theatres in the Helsinki capital area still remaining in its own, culturally protected state. The theatre has one auditorium, with 194 places. The theatre activity is owned by Espoon elokuvajuhlat ry.

Kino Tapiola is part of the Europa Cinemas network, along with seven other Finnish movie theatres.

== History ==
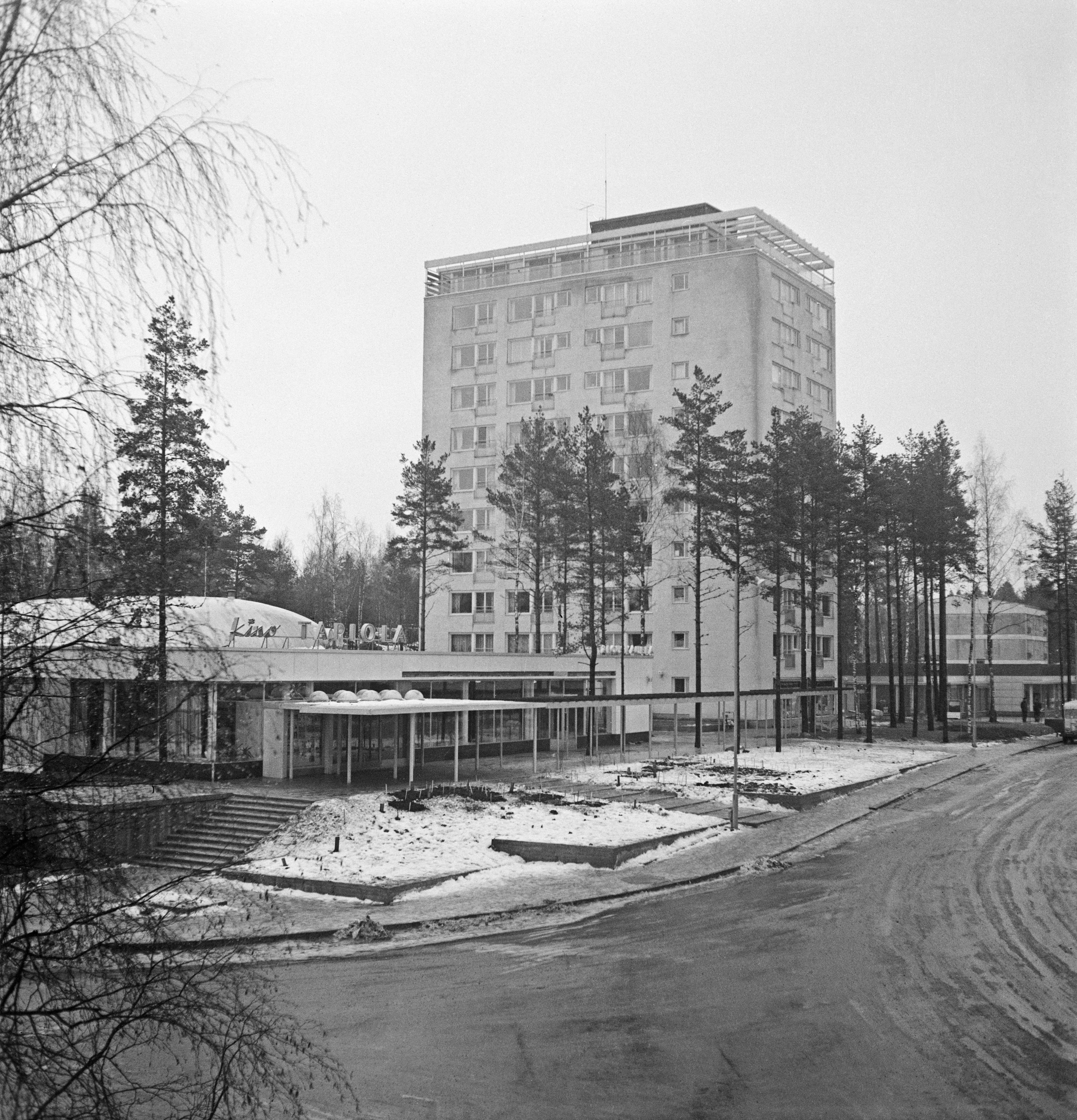
Kino Tapiola and Mäntytorni in 1954.

The theatre building, with its single auditorium, was designed by architect Aarne Ervi. The gardening plan was made by Jussi Jännes and the colouring plan by artist Eino Kauria. The first film was shown on 3 October 1955 in the auditorium which had 350 places at the time. There used to be a café in the lobby, as well as a parking hall and a service station at the back of the building. The café was later separated from the lobby and converted into a business space. The theatre is one of the traditional premises of the annual Espoo Ciné film festival.

The theatre was originally maintained by Urpo Huovilainen and his family. In 1977 the activity was transferred to Adams Filmi Oy until 1982, when Bio Jaseka took responsibility of the theatre. Jaseka ran the theatre until 2007, when it stopped it as economically unfeasible.

The activity was carried on from August 2007 by Kino Tapiola Oy, which reopened the theatre in August 2007. The activity of Kino Tapiola, which had suffered from financial troubles, stopped already in August 2008 when paint tore off from the auditorium ceiling just before the start of the Espoo Ciné festival. When asbestos was found underneath the paint, the auditorium was declared off-limits. The asbestos-based acoustics of the ceiling had to be dismantled altogether, and the presentation equipment and seats were moved away. The Espoo district court placed Kino Tapiola Oy into bankruptcy on 12 December 2008.

=== Ciné Tapiola Oy ===
After the bankruptcy of Kino Tapiola there was a small citizens' movement to preserve the theatre. Ciné Tapiola Oy, a daughter company of Espoon elokuvajuhlat Oy responsible for the Espoo Ciné film festival, was founded as joint venture by the city of Espoo and local activists. Espoo Ciné has organised festival shows at Kino Tapiola from 1993, so the theatre was already known to them. The theatre activity receives constant rent support from the city. In return, the city receives a share of the usage of the theatre for its own activities and events.

Kino Tapiola was renovated and opened its doors to the public on 13 August 2010 after a two-year break. The new theatre is equipped with both a traditional 35 mm movie film equipment and a digital 3D computer graphics projector. In autumn 2017 the theatre lobby was renovated.
