= Viljo Revell =

Finnish architect (1910–1964)

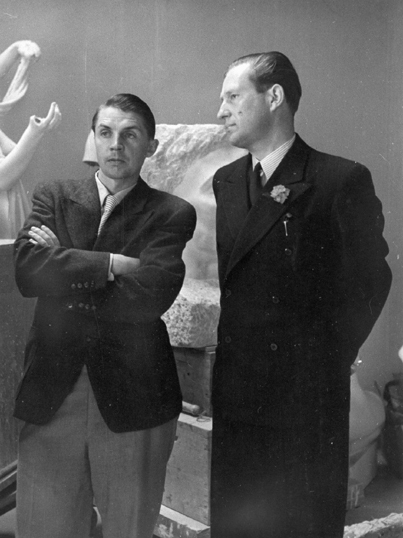
- Viljo Revell (right) with Aarne Ervi in 1943
- Born: 25 January 1910; Vaasa, Grand Duchy of Finland
- Died: 8 November 1964 (aged 54); Helsinki, Finland
- Education: Helsinki University of Technology
- Occupation: Architect
- Buildings: Lasipalatsi, Palace Hotel, Toronto City Hall
- Projects: City-Center, Helsinki

Viljo Gabriel Revell (25 January 1910 – 8 November 1964) was a Finnish architect of the functionalist school. In Finland he is best known for the design of the Lasipalatsi ("Glass Palace") and Palace Hotel, both in Helsinki. Internationally, Revell is best known for designing the New City Hall of Toronto, Ontario, Canada.

== Life and career ==
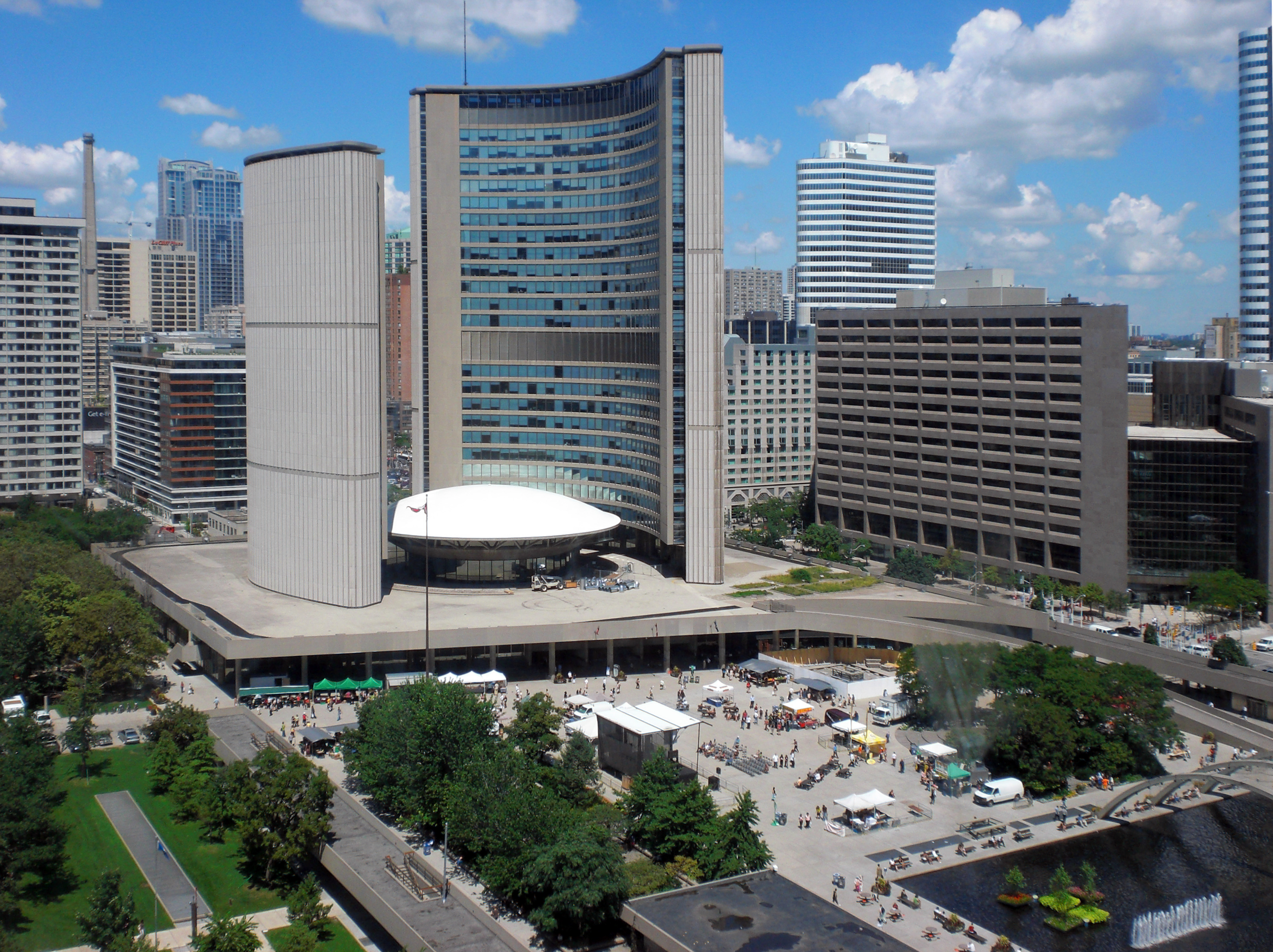
Toronto's New City Hall (1965)

Revell, originally spelt Rewell, was born in Vaasa in 1910, and graduated from Vaasan Lyseo in 1928. He graduated as an architect from the Helsinki University of Technology in 1937. He made his architectural breakthrough already the year he graduated when he, together with fellow students Heimo Riihimäki and Niilo Kokko, won the architectural competition for the design of the Lasipalatsi, which had originally been intended as a temporary building comprising shops, restaurant and cinema, but which became one of the landmarks of Finnish "white functionalist" architecture. His next major work was the so-called Teollisuuskeskus (Industrial Centre), comprising offices, hotel (Palace Hotel), roof-terrace restaurant and ground-floor shops, situated on Helsinki's south harbour seafront. The building was also based on a competition winning proposal, made together with architect Keijo Petäjä, and was completed in 1952 in time for the Helsinki Olympic Games.

Revell's international breakthrough came with winning the 1956–58 architectural competition for the design of the Toronto City Hall, which he designed together with fellow Finnish architects Heikki Castrén, Bengt Lundsten, and Seppo Valjus. Upon announcement of the winner of the architectural competition, Mayor Nathan Phillips called the design "breath-taking". Construction of the City Hall began in 1961, and was completed in 1965, the year following Revell's premature death. Revell had also commissioned that English sculptor Henry Moore to create a sculpture in keeping with the design – Three Way Piece No.2: Archer was installed in the public square in 1966 under controversy due to its cost.

Revell married Maire Myntti in 1941; they had three daughters born in 1942, 1943 and 1945. As he had excellent stereoscopic eyesight, he served as naval artillery fire control officer in World War II, and he was one of the survivors of the sinking of the Finnish Navy flagship, the coastal defence ship Ilmarinen in 1941, which killed 271 Finnish soldiers.

In 1943, at a time when post-war reconstruction was already an important topic of discussion, Revell, along with Alvar Aalto, Aarne Ervi and Kaj Englund, was one of the instigators of the Finnish Building Information File (in Finnish: rakennustietokortisto), the Finnish version of a building standards file, to assist in standardization of building practices and component sizes. The work was financed by the Finnish Association of Architects, under the name of the Standardization Institute. As part of the research the group had contacts with a similar organisation in Germany, run by architect Ernst Neufert. In June 1943, while the war was still going on, Aalto, Ervi and Revell, together with architects Jussi Paatela and Esko Suhonen, travelled to Germany at the invitation of Neufert to witness the German building standardization efforts, including the construction of government buildings designed by Albert Speer for the Nazi government.

== Significant buildings ==
- 1935 Lasipalatsi ("Crystal Palace") Helsinki with Niilo Kokko, Olavi Laisaari and Heimo Riihimäki
- 1939 Hallintalo House office building, Vaasa
- 1948 Palace Hotel Helsinki with Heikki Castrén
- 1953 Tower block in Tapiola, Espoo
- 1953/1954–1956, 1960 Kudeneule knitwear factory (current Printal), Hanko
- 1957 Villa Didrichsen Didrichsen Art Museum. New wing 1964. Kuusisaari, Helsinki
- 1960 City-Center office building ("Makkaratalo" or "Sausage Building"), Helsinki with Heikki Castrén
- 1961 Finnish Ministry of Defence (with Heikki Castrén), Helsinki.
- 1962 Office block in Vaasa now called the "Rewell Center"
- 1965 New City Hall, Toronto, Ontario, Canada.
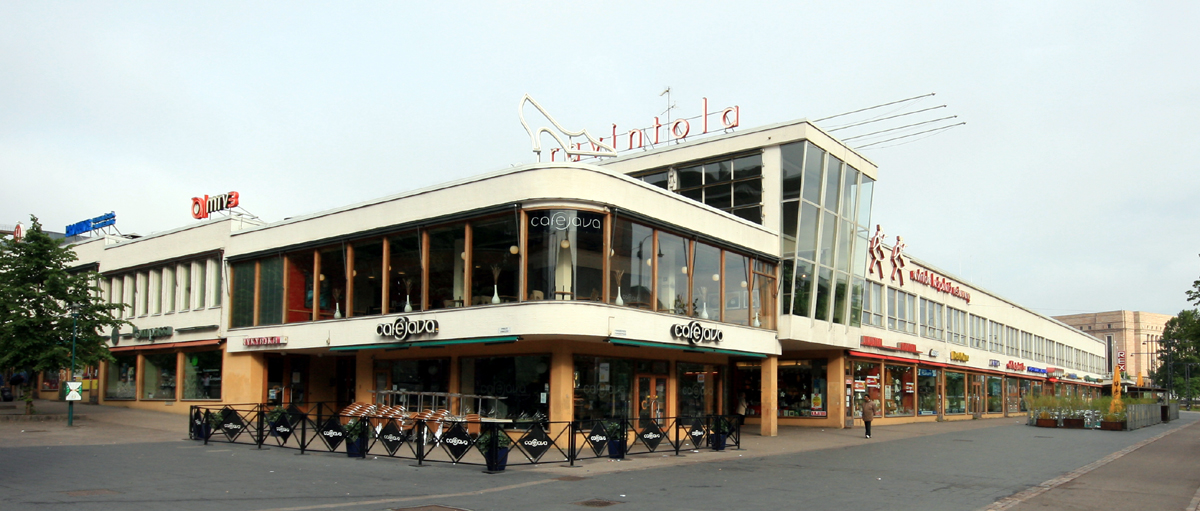
Lasipalatsi, Helsinki, with Kokko, Laisaari and Riihimäki (1935).

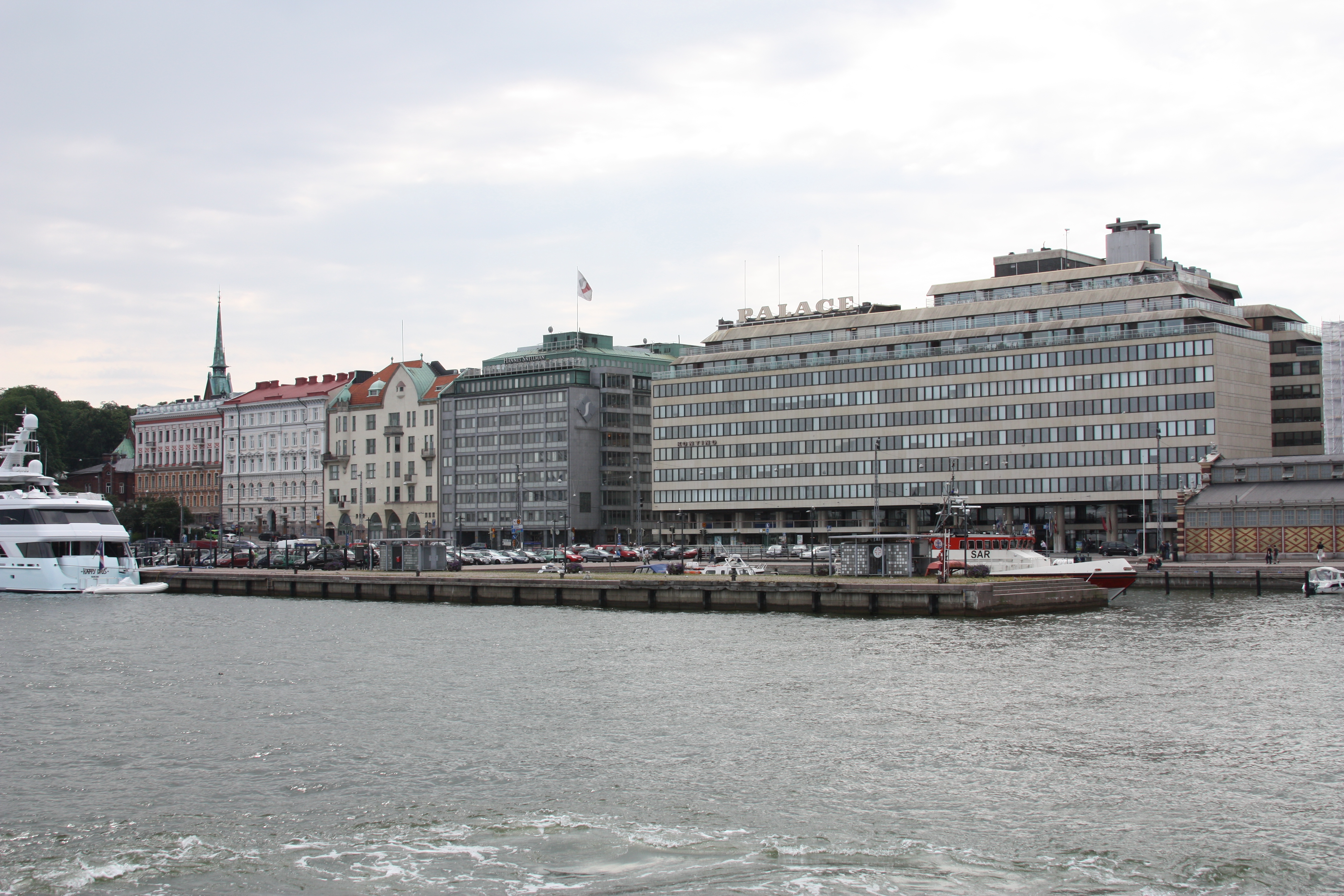
Palace Hotel, Helsinki, with Petäjä (1952).

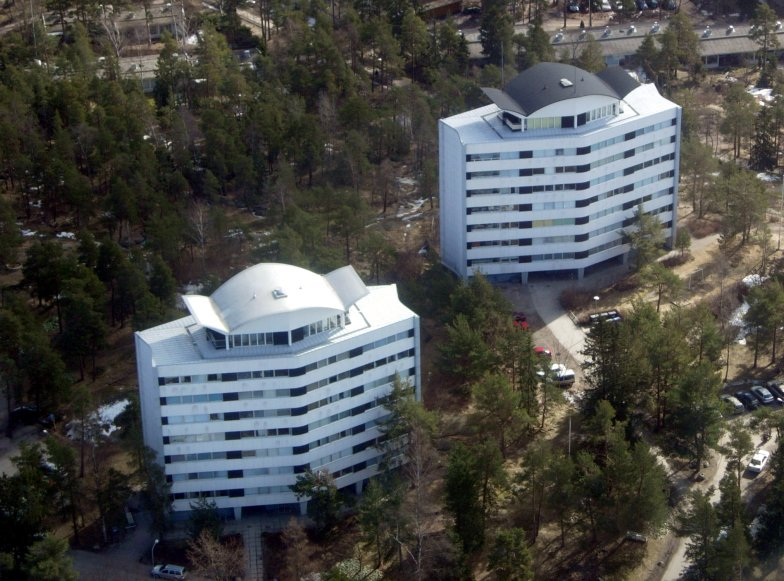
Taskumatti houses, Tapiola (1953).

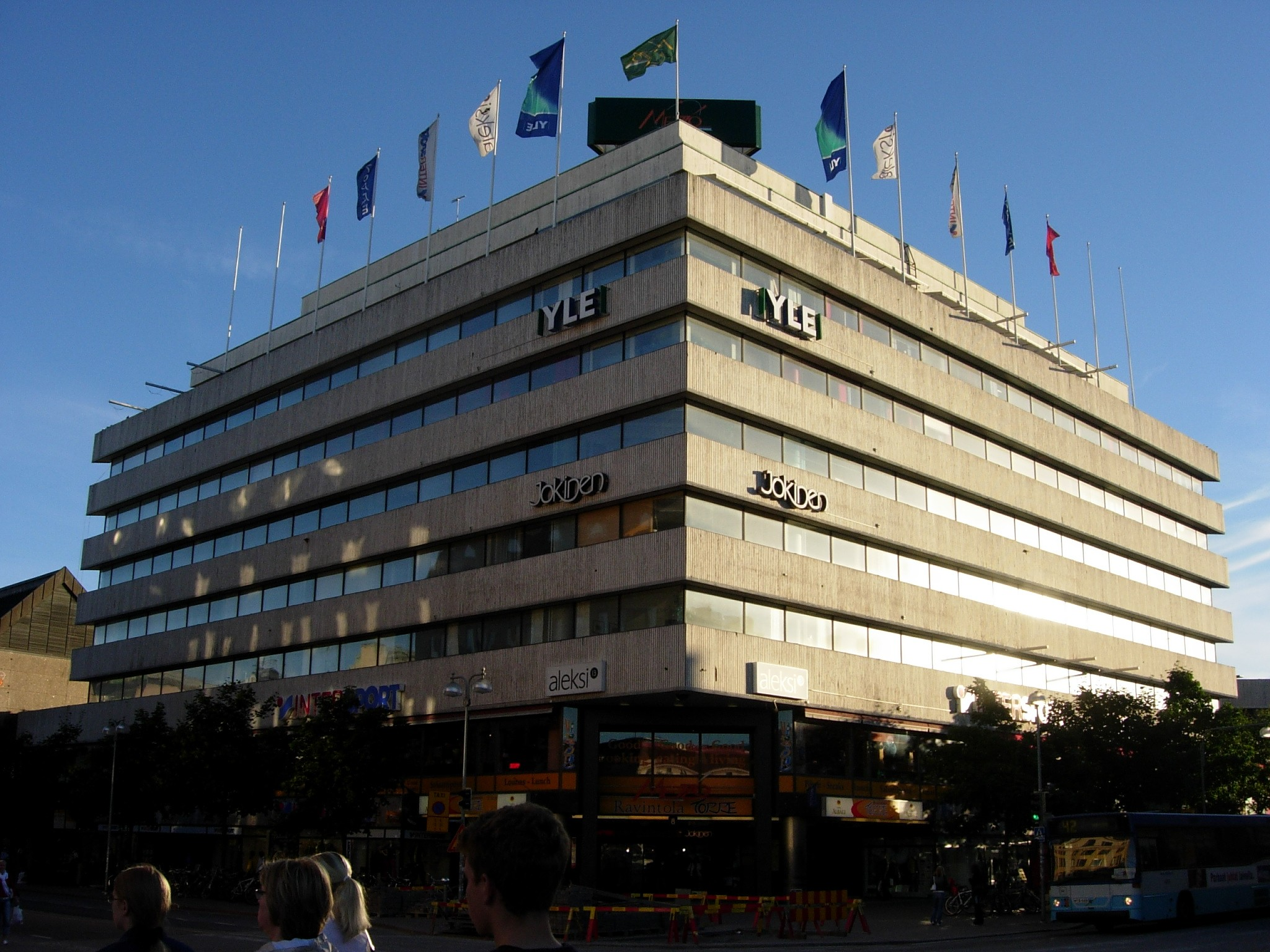
KOP Bank building, Turku (1960).

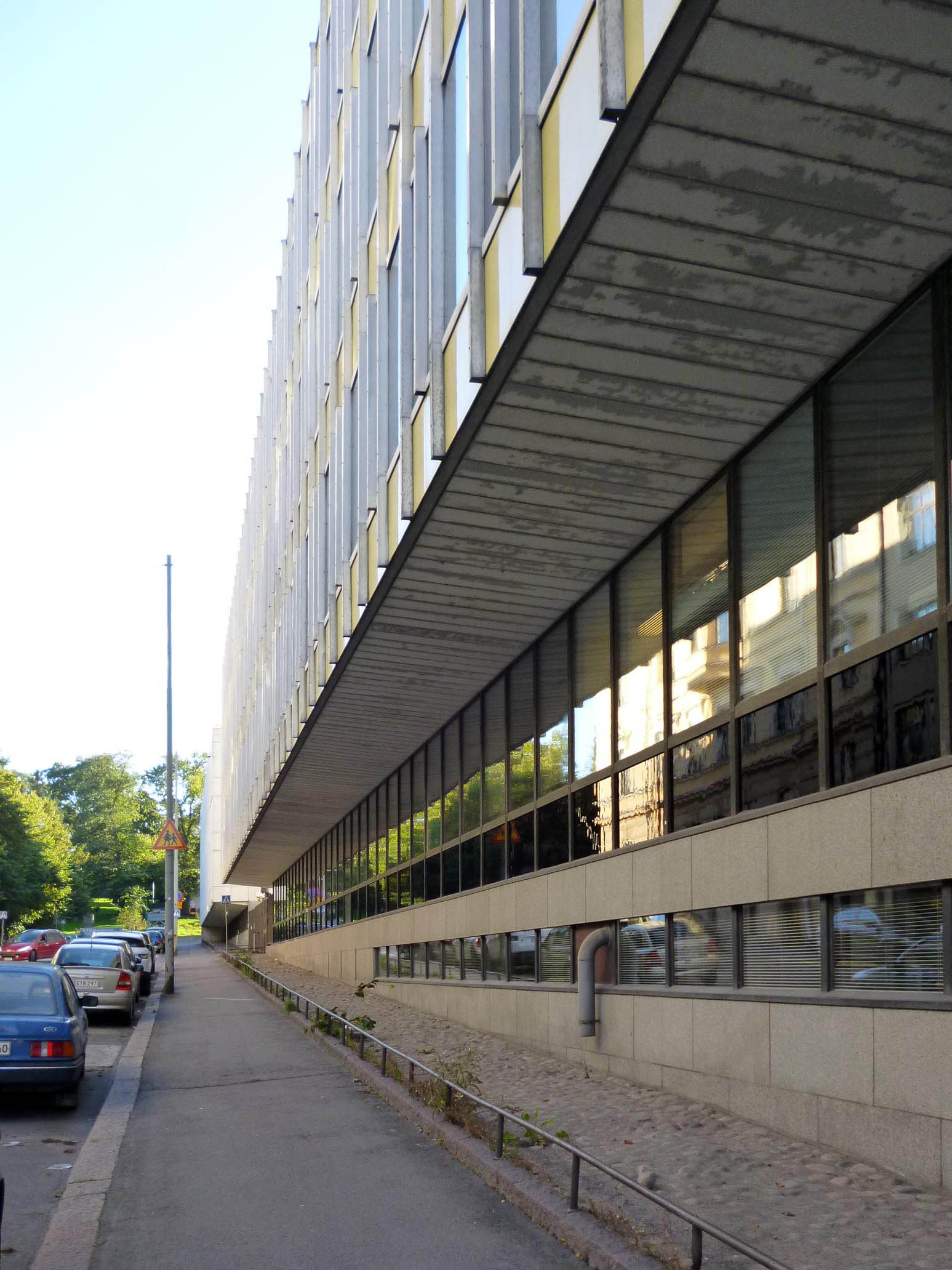
Finnish Ministry of Defence, Helsinki, with Castrén (1961).

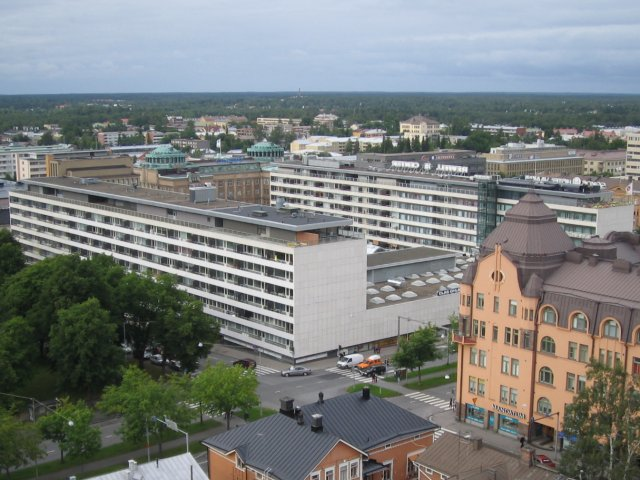
Revell Center, Vaasa (1963).

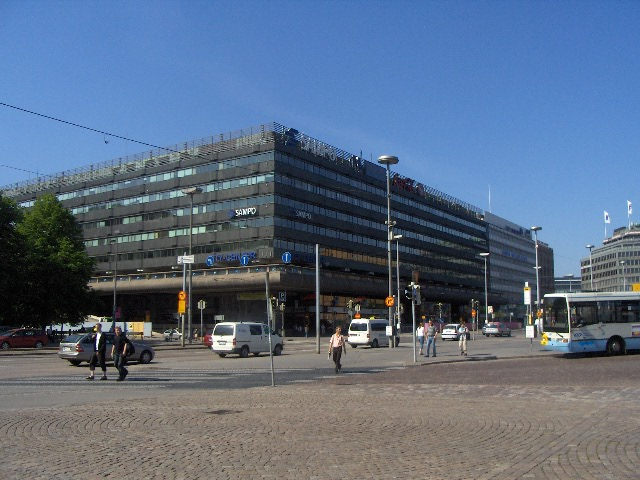
City-Center, Helsinki, with Castrén (1958–67).
