= Hip flask houses =

Residential buildings in Espoo, Finland

Coordinates: 60°10′32″N 24°47′43″E

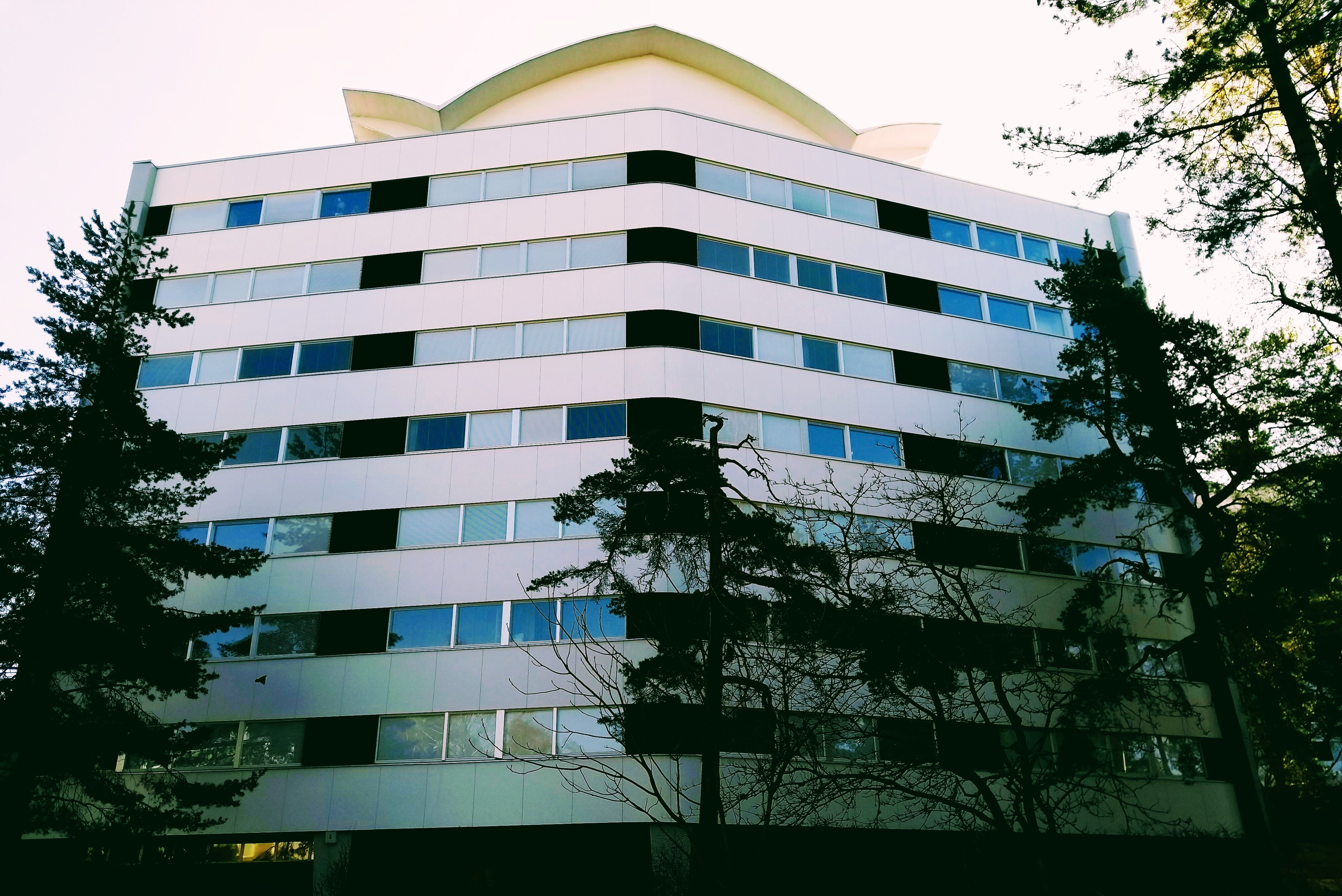
One of the Hip flask houses in May 2022.

The hip flask houses (Finnish: taskumattitalot) are a group of four apartment buildings built in 1959 and 1961 in the Länsikorkee area of the Tapiola district in Espoo, Finland. The buildings have nine floors each and are 30 metres high. They were designed by architect Viljo Revell. The Hip flask houses dominate the appearance of the area and have become a sort of symbol of Tapiola. The Tapiola area is a culturally significant architecture area and the Hip flask houses are among the landmarks of the area.

The two first houses, As. Oy Säästökontu and As. Oy Tornitaso were built in 1959. These two houses are the northernmost. Säästökontu was one of the first housing savings targets in Finland. The other two houses, As. Oy Tornikontu and As. Oy Nelostorni were built in 1961. The houses were referred to as the "Hip flask houses" even before they had been completed, in September 1957. The total floor area of the buildings is 3220 square metres and each floor has a surface area of 358 square metres. The lots of the buildings range from 1100 to 2050 square metres in area. The collective formed by the buildings also includes As. Oy Riistakallio built in 1961, an oblong lamella building with five floors.

The slender, hexagonal form of the buildings was accomplished by building the facades as convex in the middle and bending the angles of the buildings as concave. The vertical ditches in the corners emphasise the rise of the mass. The top floors are emphasised by separate roofs. The longer facades are clad in horizontal Minerit emphasised with teak grids and window panes. The balconies are located on the inside of the outer facades and thus blend in into the facade.

The buildings have seven apartment floors with seven to eight apartments per floor. The top floor of each building has a sauna, a panorama terrace, ventilation balconies and drying cabinets. The kitchens of the apartments were advanced at the time of construction, as they included kitchen hoods and the kitchen cupboards were detached from the floor. The low cupboard doors in the kitchens are made of teak.
