= Tapiola =

Tapiola Hagalund
- District of Espoo
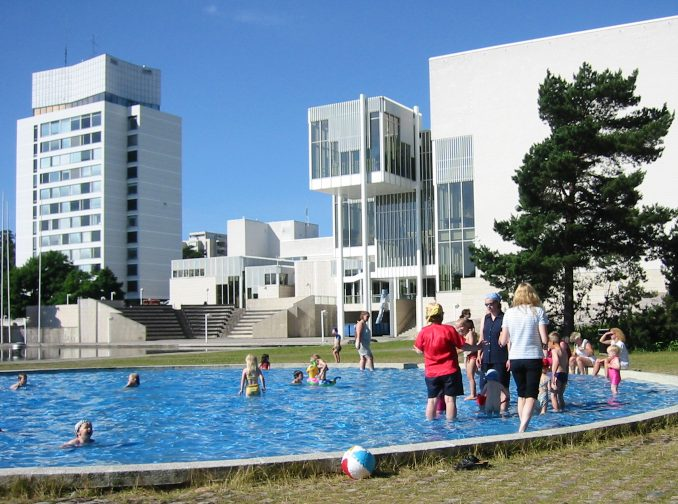
- The Espoo cultural centre and the Keskustorni (central tower)
- Etymology: Finnish: Tapio, a forest spirit in Finnish mythology
- Location of Tapiola (red) within Espoo (light green) and Suur-Tapiola (dark green)
- Coordinates: 60°10′32″N 24°48′09″E
- Country: Finland
- Municipality: Espoo
- Region: Uusimaa
- Sub-region: Helsinki metropolitan area
- Main District: Suur-Tapiola
- Inner District(s): Itäkartano, Länsikorkee, Otsolahti, Tapiolan keskus

Area
  - Total: 3.5 km^{2} (1.4 sq mi)

Population (2012)
  - Total: 9,325
  - Density: 2,700/km^{2} (6,900/sq mi)

Languages
  - Finnish: 89.9 %
  - Swedish: 6.4 %
  - Other: 3.7 %
- Postal Code(s): 02100, 02120
- Jobs: 7,483
- Website: www.tapiolankeskus.fi

Tapiola (Finnish: [ˈtɑpiolɑ]; Swedish: Hagalund) is a district of the municipality of Espoo on the south coast of Finland, and is one of the major urban centres of Espoo. It is located in the western part of Helsinki capital region. The name Tapiola is derived from Tapio, who is the forest god of Finnish mythology, especially as expressed in the Kalevala.

Tapiola was largely constructed in the 1950s and 1960s by the Finnish housing foundation and was designed as a garden city. It is the location of the Espoo cultural centre, the Espoo Museum of Modern Art (EMMA), the Espoo city museum, and the Espoo City Theatre.

According to the Finnish National Board of Antiquities, Tapiola was the largest and most valuable example of the 1960s construction ideologies in Finland. Its architecture and landscaping that combine urban living with nature have attracted tourists ever since.

== Name ==
The original name for the Tapiola area was Björnvik, based on a bay with the same name, currently called Otsolahti (both names mean "Bay of bears", in Swedish and Finnish respectively), and the island of Björnholm on the southeastern side of the bay and the Björnholm croft located on the island. A mansion called Hagalund was built on the lands of the Björnvik village in the 19th century, giving rise to the Swedish name for Tapiola, Hagalund. The Finnish name Tapiola was the result of a competition held for the name of a new garden city in the 1950s. The name is based on the god Tapio in the ancient Finnish religion, which also has a connection to the traditional bear motive.

== History ==
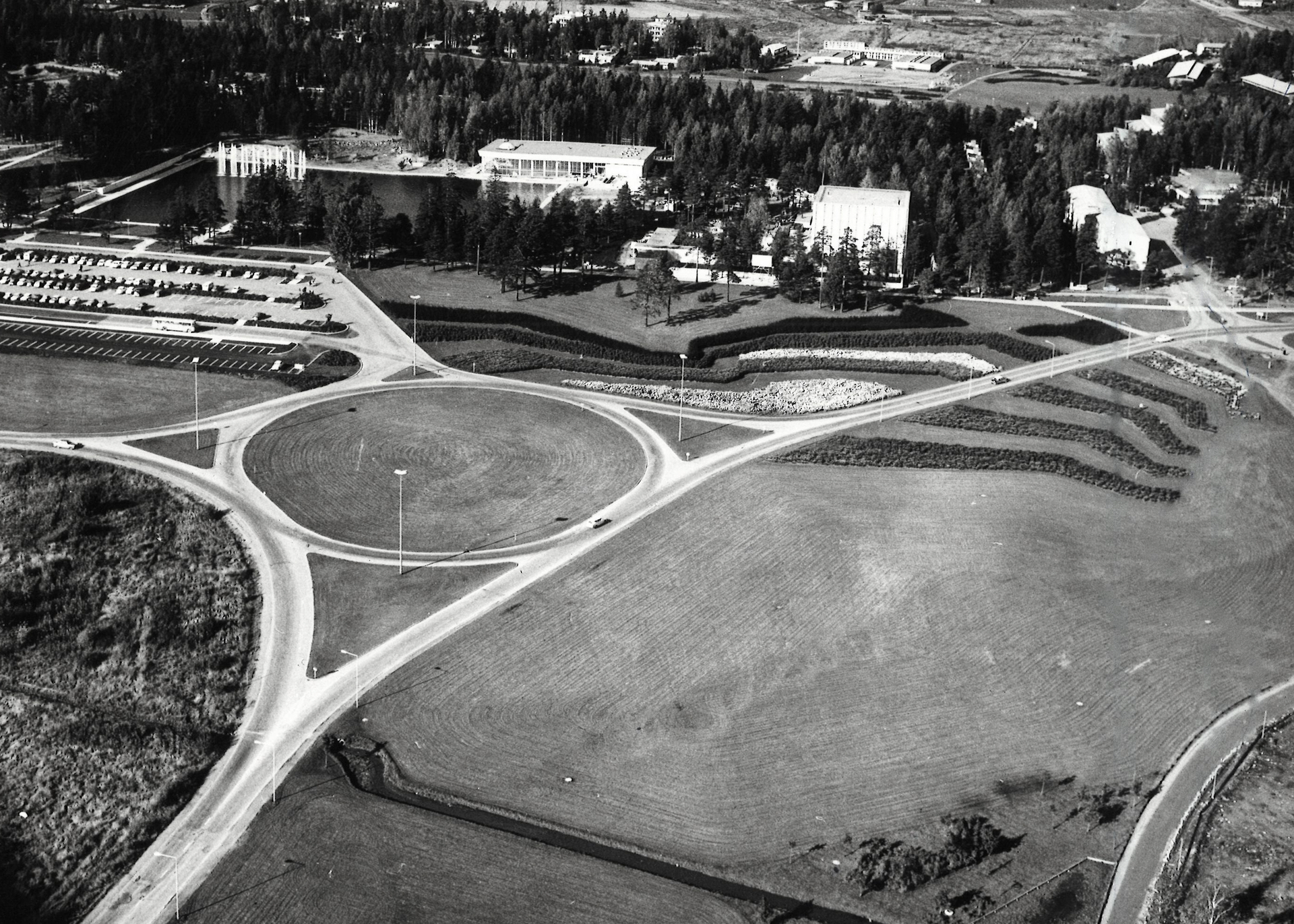
A view of Tapiola in 1965.

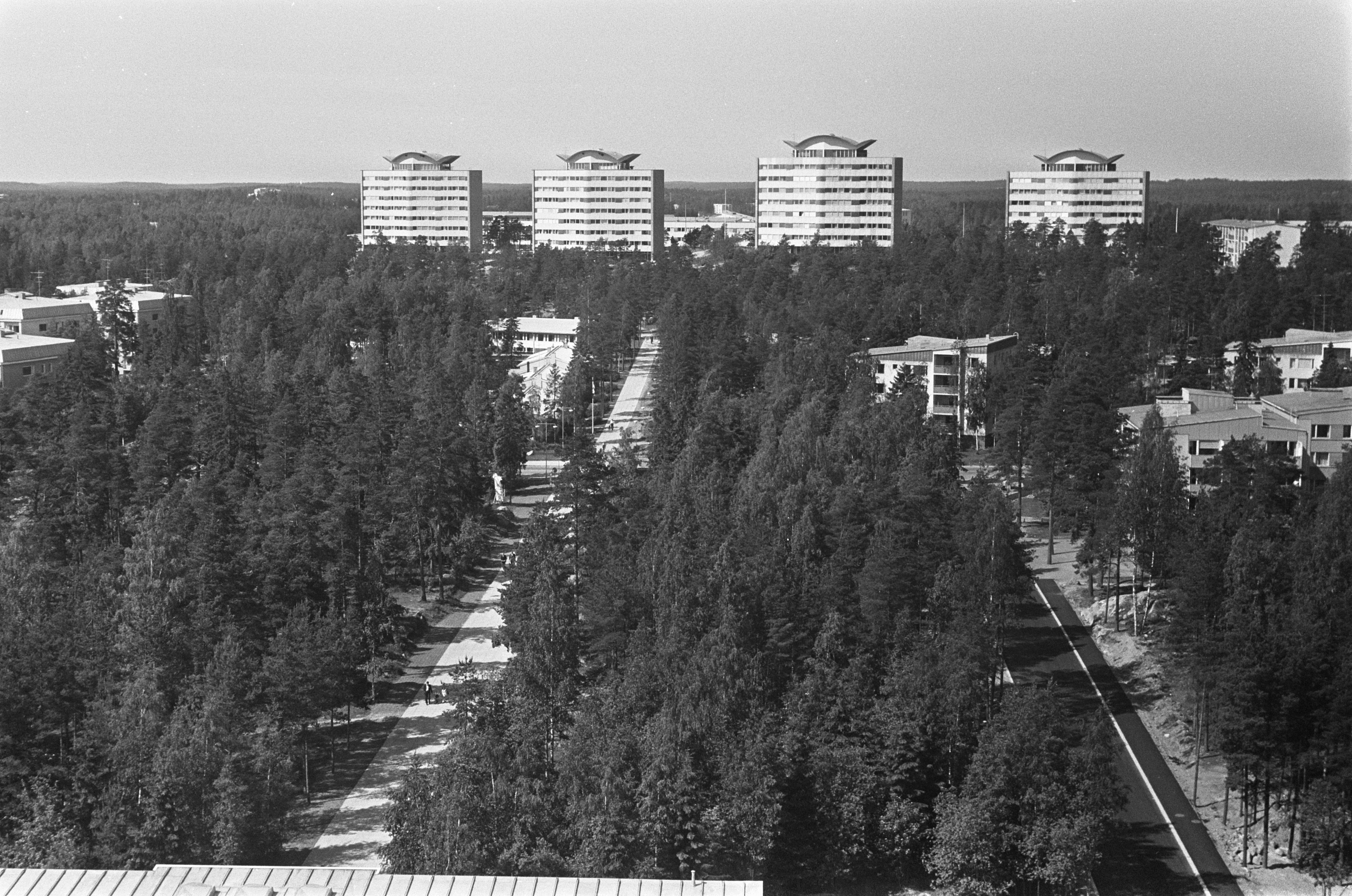
The "hip flask houses" in Tapiola were built from 1959 to 1961. This image is from 1967.

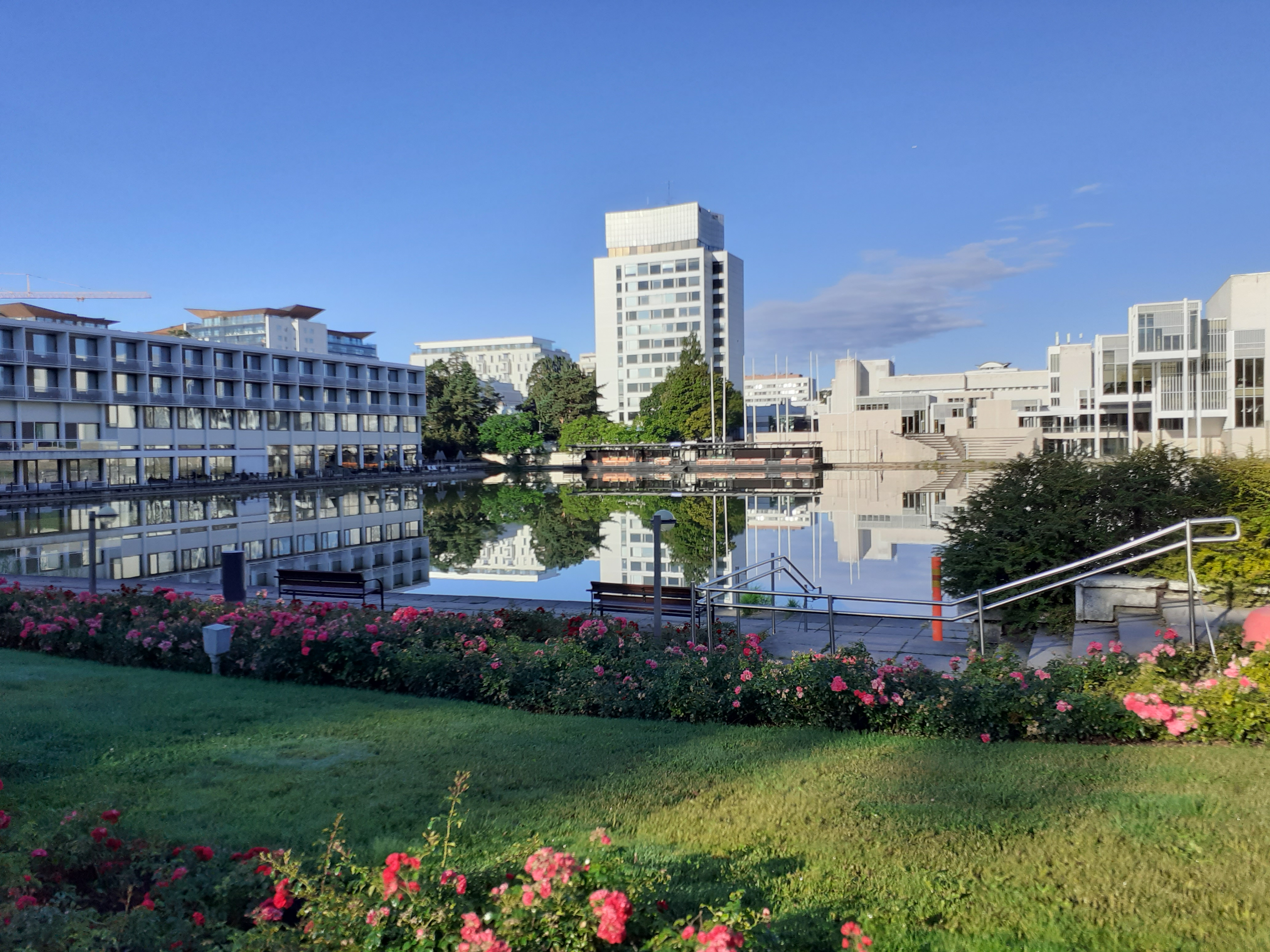
The central pool is surrounded by Tapiola Garden Hotel, Central Tower, and Espoo Culture Center.

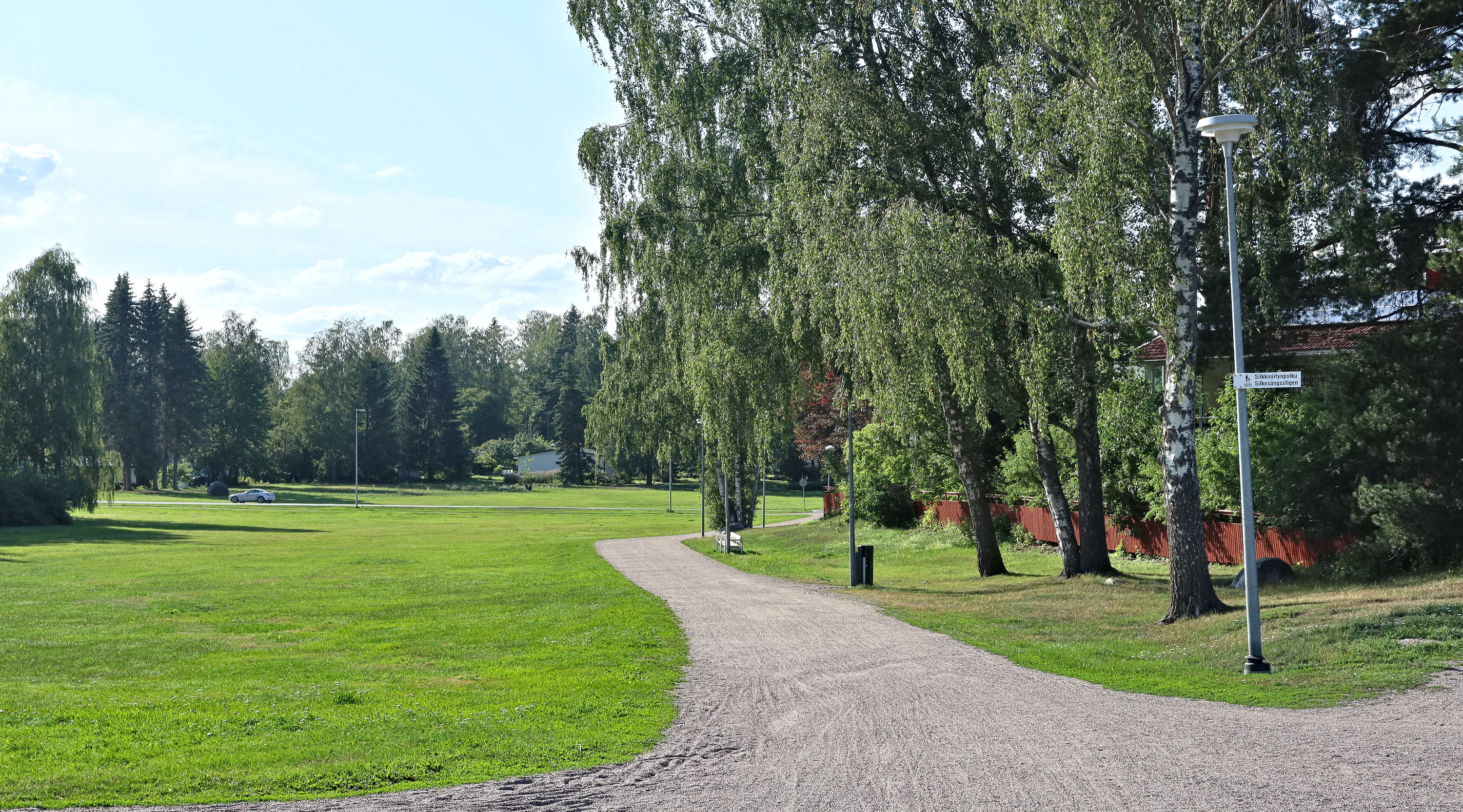
Silkkiniitty in Tapiola.

As car traffic in Finland started increasing in the 1920s, planning for a southern road connection westwards from Helsinki started. The city of Helsinki bought the island of Lauttasaari in the 1930s and a decision to construct a road from Lauttasaari to the village of Jorvas (presently located in the municipality of Kirkkonummi) was made. The road Jorvaksentie (now known as the Länsiväylä highway) running on the southern border of Tapiola was opened for traffic in 1937. When the Soviet Union returned the Porkkala area to Finland in 1956, this road became an important connection to the western part of Uusimaa. Turning the road into a motorway started in 1961 and the road reached Espoonlahti in 1969. At this point the road was officially named Länsiväylä.

The part of the Kehä I beltway from Länsiväylä to Leppävaara, forming the eastern border of Tapiola, was built in the 1960s as a public road.

After the Continuation War had ended in 1944 the entire country of Finland suffered from shortage of housing. In the Moscow Armistice, Finland had been forced to reinstate all the areas it had ceded from the Soviet Union, which meant that the evacuees from Finnish Karelia had to be settled in Finland. Already during the Continuation War, the Finnish Family Federation had decided that action had to be taken to relieve the shortage of housing.

Tapiola was one of the first post-war "new town" projects in Continental Europe. It was created by a private non-profit enterprise called Asuntosäätiö (the Housing Foundation), which was established in 1951 by six social trade organisations including the Confederation of Finnish Trade Unions, the Central Organisation of Tenants, the Mannerheim Child Welfare Federation, the Finnish Federation of Civilian and Military Invalids and the Civil Servants' Federation.

The project was conceived, built and managed by Heikki von Hertzen, the executive of the Asuntosäätiö and garden city advocate. Von Hertzen was a lawyer, who had worked as a branch manager for a bank in Tampere before becoming the director of the Finnish Family Federation.

Under von Hertzen's leadership, the Housing Foundation bought 660 acres (267 ha) of forest land, six miles (9.65km) from the centre of Helsinki, and set out to create an ideal garden city. The role of the Housing Foundation included financing the project and overseeing the planning and building process so as to ensure consistency within different areas of the town. The Housing Foundation's unique combination of various socio-political organisations facilitated the negotiation of funds with governmental bodies. Von Hertzen set out to create a modern urban environment that would address the housing shortage in Helsinki while also being economically viable and beautiful. Tapiola did not form part of any wider plan for Finland's development other than von Hertzen's Seven Towns Plan, a response to urban sprawl in Helsinki.

In 1946 von Hertzen explained his thoughts about urban planning in his pamphlet Koti vaiko kasarmi lapsillemme ("A home or a barracks for our children?"), where he strongly criticised the cramped and gloomy closed city blocks of Helsinki and defended the importance of nature in a built environment. This idea of a garden city movement was inspired by the garden design principles of the British Ebenezer Howard. New residential areas in Sweden also served as inspiration for Tapiola.

The original city plans for Tapiola were made by Otto-Iivari Meurman. Later, the Housing Foundation made significant changes to the plans, and handed planning of Tapiola over to a group of prominent Finnish architects, including Aarne Ervi, Alvar Aalto, and Kaija Siren. Each member of the group designed their own part of the area and its buildings, including social housing blocks (80% of all dwellings) and individual houses.

The planners of Tapiola were convinced that no one professional group could solve the manifold problems of modern community planning; planning has to be highly skilled and strictly directed teamwork at all levels. Tapiola is a result of close teamwork in the fields of architecture, sociology, civil engineering, landscape gardening, domestic science, and youth welfare.

The name of the garden city itself was chosen through a public competition in 1953. The winning name, which in Finnish means the home of the Tapio, the forest god from the Kalevala, was suggested by eleven different people. The prominent difference between the Finnish and Swedish names is explained by different etymologies. The Swedish name Hagalund comes from Hagalund manor, whose lands originally included the site of present-day Tapiola, even though the main building of the manor is actually located in nearby Otaniemi, separated from Tapiola by the Kehä I beltway. The original northernmost part of Tapiola was separated to its own district called Pohjois-Tapiola ("Northern Tapiola").

Tapiola is also the cultural centre of Espoo, as it houses the Espoo cultural centre (home of the Tapiola Sinfonietta), the city museum (in the WeeGee house), and the Espoo City Theatre. The Tapiola library is located in the cultural centre.

== Future ==
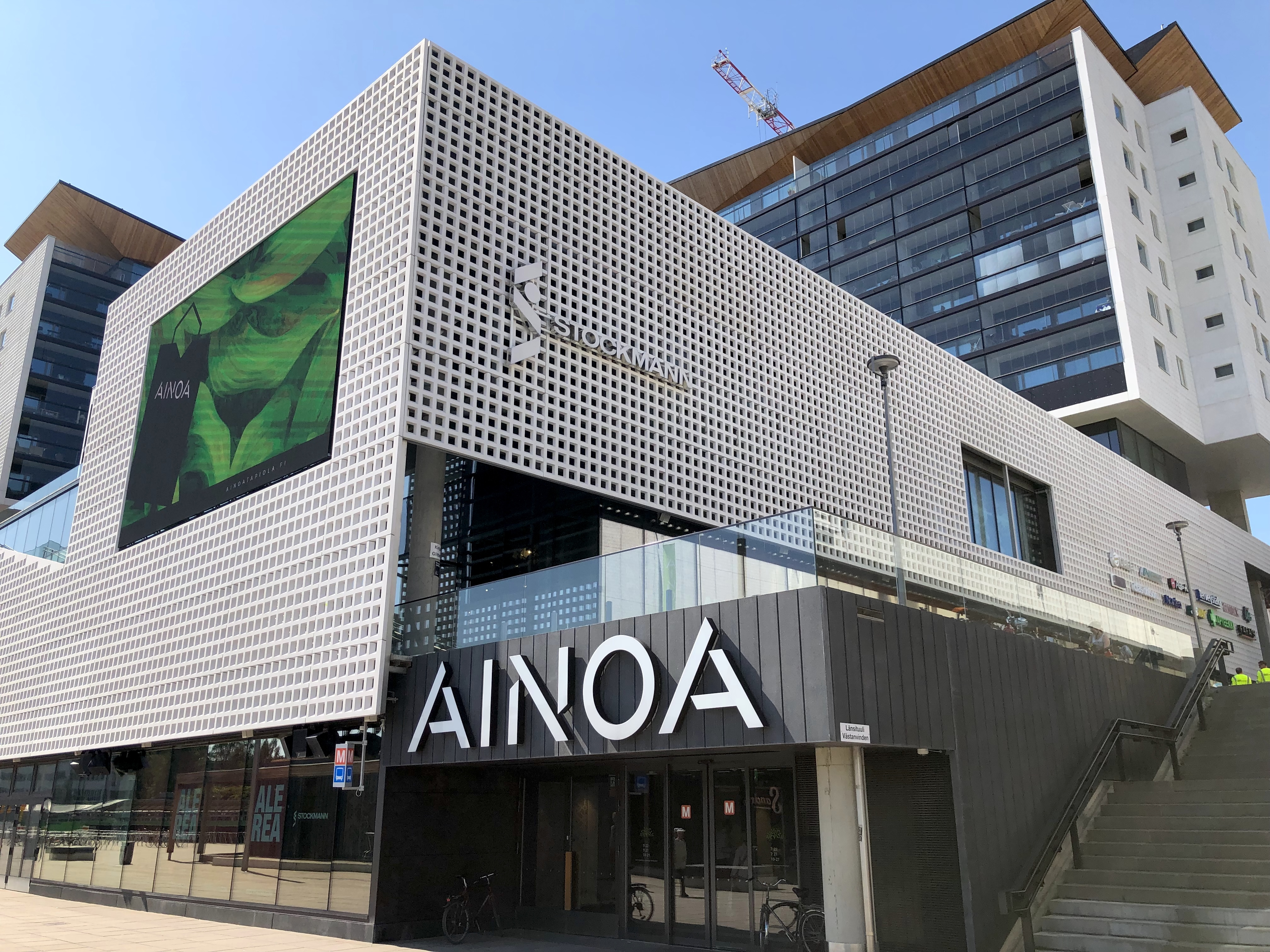
Ainoa shopping centre.

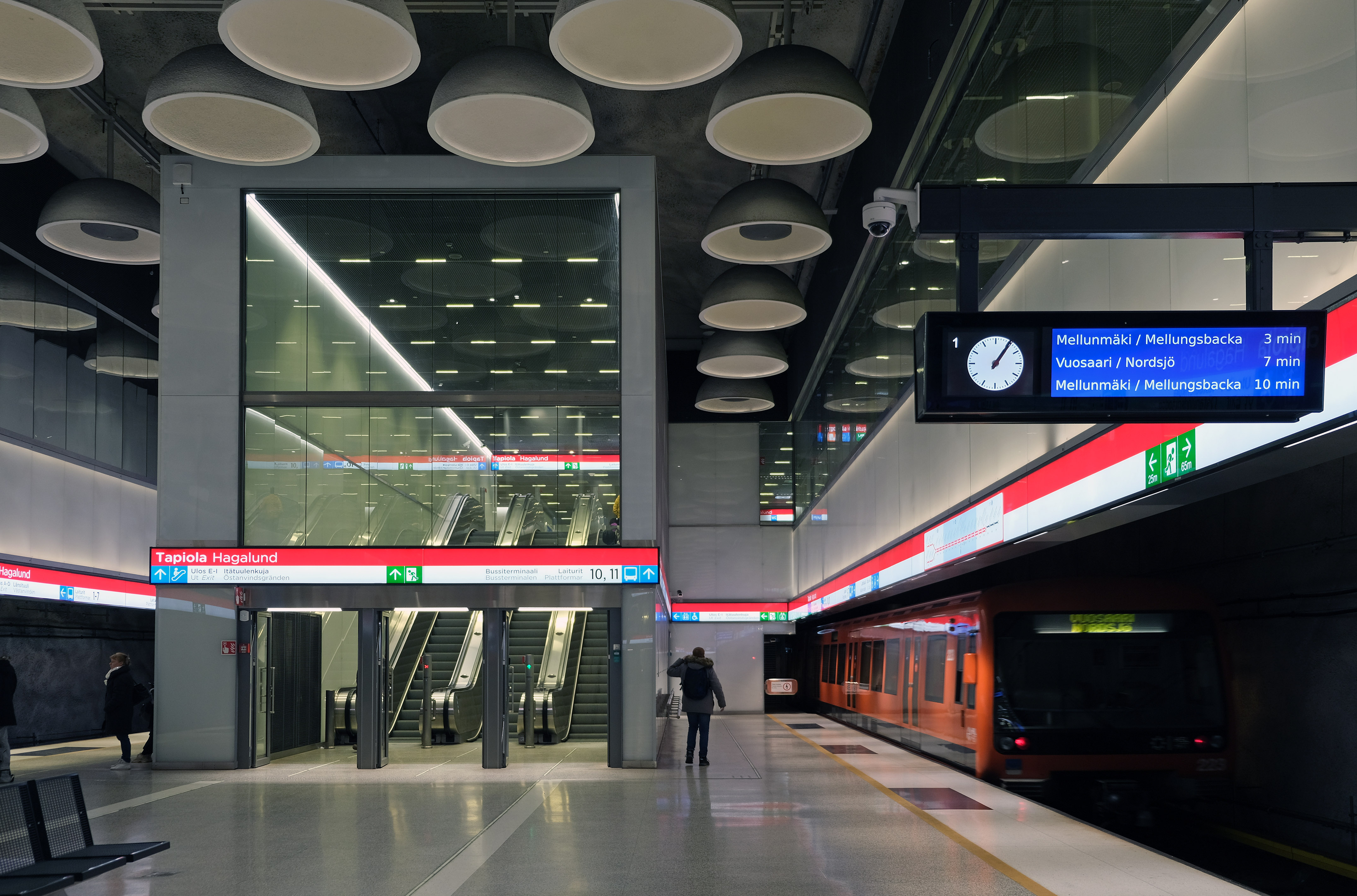
Tapiola metro station.

The business centre of Tapiola has been significantly renovated by building business and office buildings deviating from the original design of Tapiola and based on the principles of dismantling and expanding construction. The development of the business centre is still ongoing. New space for residence, culture and services will be available when parking and maintenance will be moved to an underground parking garage with space for three thousand cars. The Espoo City Theatre will also move to new premises in connection to the business centre. This renovation is connected to the Länsimetro expansion including the Tapiola metro station taken into use in 2017, which is located underneath the parking garage dug into the rock.

The residential buildings and their environments in Tapiola will also be renovated. The most important renovation projects include the improvement of the appearance of the Mäntyviita urban space and renovating the current residential buildings.

== Urban planning ==
Tapiola brought worldwide fame for Finnish urban planning. From its first stages it gained both a national and international reputation for its high class architecture and landscaping, as well as an ideological experiment. Tapiola's planners aimed at demonstrating a new direction for Finnish town planning and housing. The aim of the Housing Foundation was to create a garden city which would be a microcosm of Finnish society: all social classes would live there and there would be different types of buildings, ranging from detached houses to terraced and multi-storey blocks. The slogan of the project was: "we do not want to build houses or dwellings but socially healthful surroundings for contemporary man and his family". Tapiola provided a utopian vision of society and an alternative to what was seen at the time as an oppressive urban environment. In this sense, Tapiola was both an experiment and a model.

Tapiola was built using some of the principles of Ebenezer Howard's garden city. The founder of Tapiola, Heikki von Hertzen, believed that it was not possible to create a satisfactory residential centre if the population density exceeded a certain figure. Hertzen's vision for Tapiola, which was originally planned for an area of 600 acres, was to have only 26 residents per acre, and a total of 15,000 people. The ground was divided into four neighbourhood units, separated by green belts, and in the middle was built a main shopping and cultural centre to meet the needs of 30,000 inhabitants (including those of surrounding districts) (Hertzen 1959). An important feature of garden cities is the development of a self-contained community. This meant that as many jobs as possible had to be provided – as many as could be at a distance of less than 10 km from Helsinki.

The architects commissioned to plan Tapiola had also been influenced by Le Corbusier and other proponents of Modernism, and thus their urban ideals also included tower blocks forming impressive silhouettes, as well as a dense method of building. The various residential units which made up Tapiola comprise multi-storey blocks and individual homes, either detached or in rows, introducing a note of variety in the neighbourhood and allowing for the mixing of residents. Combining the architecture of modernism and the ideology of the garden city movement is credited for the huge interest in Tapiola's planning history.

The main planning features on which Tapiola was built, as synthesised from Von Hertzen's writings, are summarised below:

- The starting point of planning is the individuality of man and closeness to nature, and the aesthetic value of nature and use of natural contours of the landscape are retained wherever possible.
- Nature dominates, architecture is secondary. All buildings must harmonise with the natural setting.
- To be a working town, not a dormitory or nursery, providing as many jobs as possible to its inhabitants.
- The town should provide for a range of income levels – "a community of everyman, where the ordinary worker, successful businessman and university professor can live side-by-side".
- Consistent placing of multi-story buildings with alternatively low housing, resulting in a feeling of spaciousness and variety.

=== Neighbourhoods ===
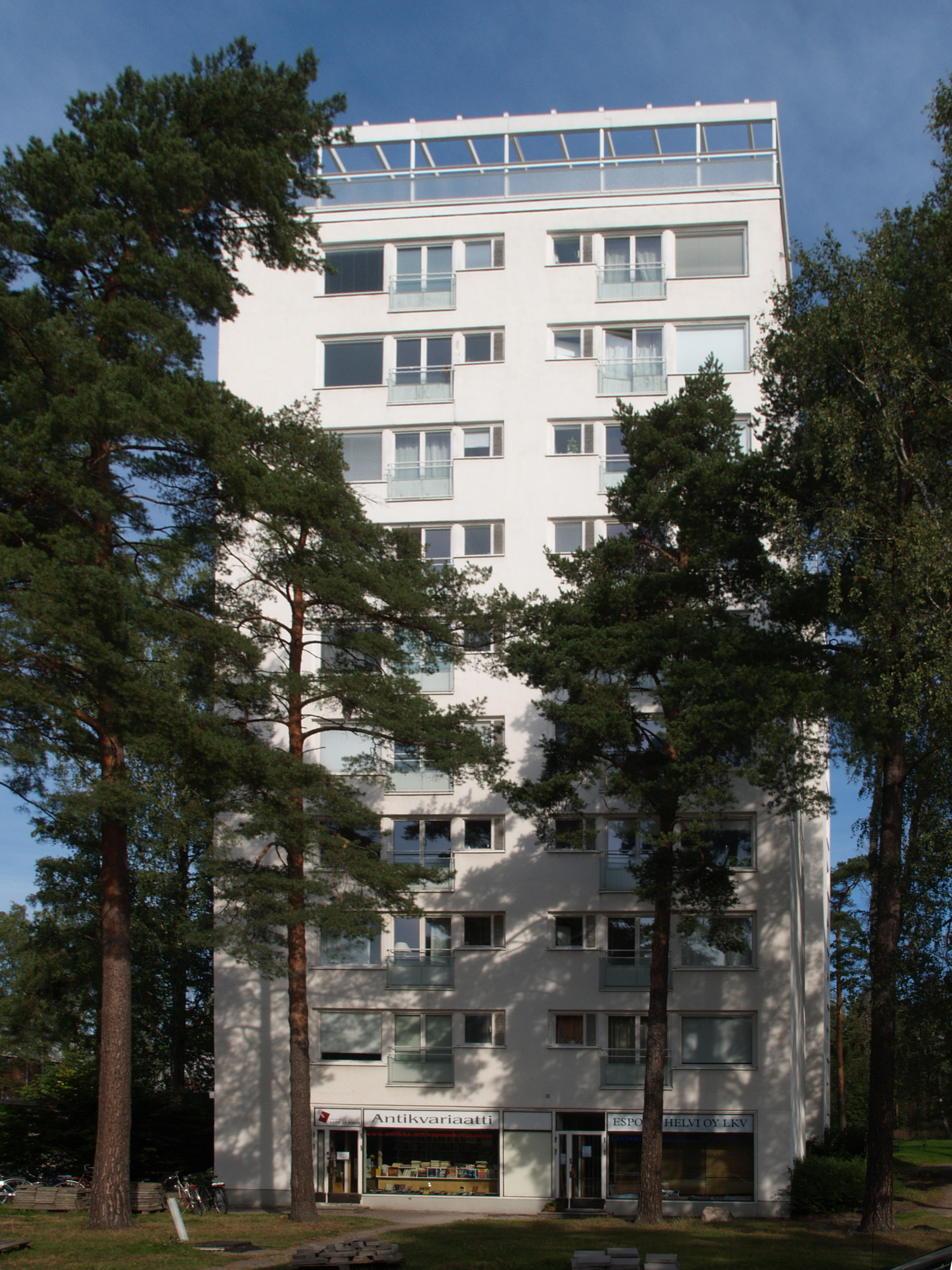
Mäntytorni apartment building, designed by Aarne Ervi

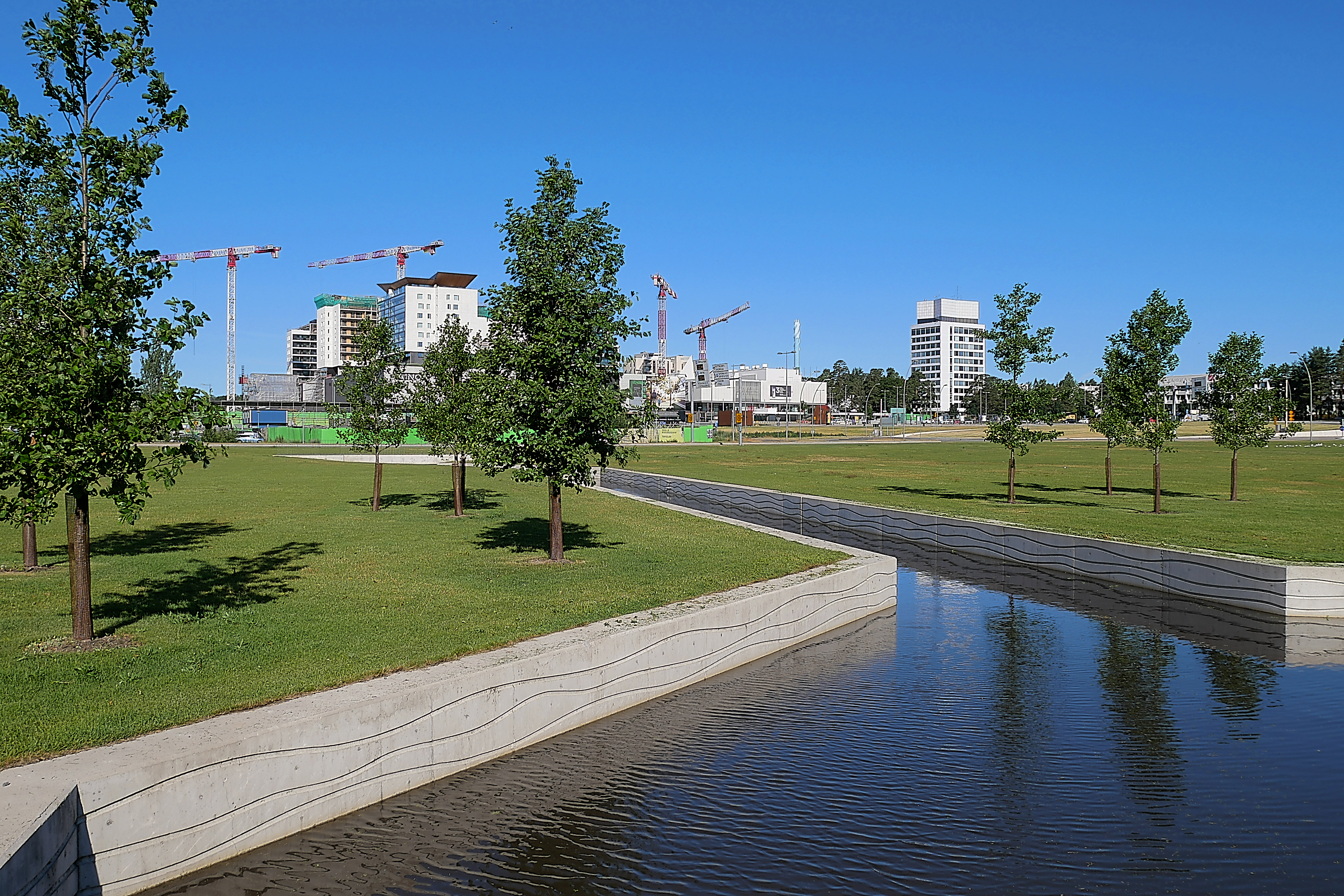
The park east of the center of Tapiola.

The development of Tapiola occurred in several stages: the eastern neighbourhood 1952 – 1956, the western neighbourhood, 1957-1960, the town centre 1958-1961-1970, the northern neighbourhood 1958-1967, the southern neighbourhood 1961-1965. Planning in Tapiola commenced with architect, Otto-Iivari Meurman's site plan and building schedule which were reviewed from 1951 onwards. His original plan detailed four neighbourhoods split by two crossing roads and set apart by green belts.

Architects Aarne Ervi, Viljo Revell, Aulis Blomstedt and Markus Tavio were charged with designing the eastern neighbourhood based on Meurman's plan. They were required to design buildings suited to the surrounding environment and the topography of the area.

A housing team was created to appraise the architects' housing designs; this process occurred more frequently during the development of the eastern neighbourhood. Team members were from a wide range of fields and included a building engineer, a heating engineer, two independent architects, an electrical engineer, a landscape gardener, a domestic science expert, a child welfare expert, a sociologist, and a housewife. This unique team, coupled with the board of the Housing Foundation, assessed housing designs, taking into consideration the needs and desires of future residents from a diverse range of backgrounds. The parties had different beliefs and values, which sometimes led to disagreements, for example the Housing Foundation was concerned with economising whilst the home-economics experts were chiefly concerned with the needs of families. Thus planning in Tapiola was collaborative and proactive as it involved targeting specific family types and classes, deciding on an ideal lifestyle for these residents, which accordingly influenced their behaviours. Many dwellings were designed to house a specific family-type and lifestyle. For example, it was perceived to be ideal to have families with children reside in dwellings, at or close to ground level in order for the children to have better access to the outdoors and to parks, whilst a tower block with one-room flats was designed to accommodate childless couples.

Meurman resigned from the board of governors of the Housing Foundation in 1954 following a shift from developing a town with low population density (six persons per acre) and low-rise buildings dwellings, as advocated by Meurman, to more multi-storey buildings and a higher population density (30 persons per acre) as recommended by other architects and the Housing Foundation. This shift was prompted by the need to accommodate a larger population, triggered by the housing shortage in Finland. Ervi took up Meurman's position as master planner.

The development of the eastern neighbourhood led to the implementation of important planning principles such as providing facilities that encourage interaction and foster a sense of community as well as the separation of vehicles and pedestrians. It was also deemed necessary to have a mixture of building types located within the one area to encourage social diversification. The eastern and western residential areas of Tapiola featured curved streets of varying sizes and positions, whilst the northern neighbourhood designed by architect Pentti Ahola, marked a return to the orthogonal grid plan. Ahola's design however, reflected the original aims of Tapiola; that of encouraging social diversification by locating a variety of building types within the one area. Financial concerns affected the development of the western area of Tapiola, leading to the construction of housing units that were economically feasible.

In 1953 Aarne Ervi was awarded the commission to plan the town centre. The aim of the town centre's design was to provide all the facilities necessary for a modern urban centre and to maximise social interaction. The centre included a market square, public square, church, public premises, businesses and an administration building. As with the other areas of Tapiola, the centre was designed with consideration for the site's features and terrain as well as to provide an active and versatile environment for pedestrians. Roads surrounded the central area producing a modern design completely separate from vehicles and featuring a special route for pedestrians and cyclists only (Tapionraitti). Ervi ensured the centre preserved the garden-city character of Tapiola by locating the buildings around an artificial lake, however this plan was considered strange and criticised for its lack of density. The centre was later expanded with a pedestrian based shopping centre linked to the Tapionraitti, notable for its undercover, outdoor pathways. Later developments showed less consideration for the natural surroundings, though most developments respected the dominance of the existing buildings. Tapiola's centre did not expand to such an extent as to rival Helsinki.

== Services ==
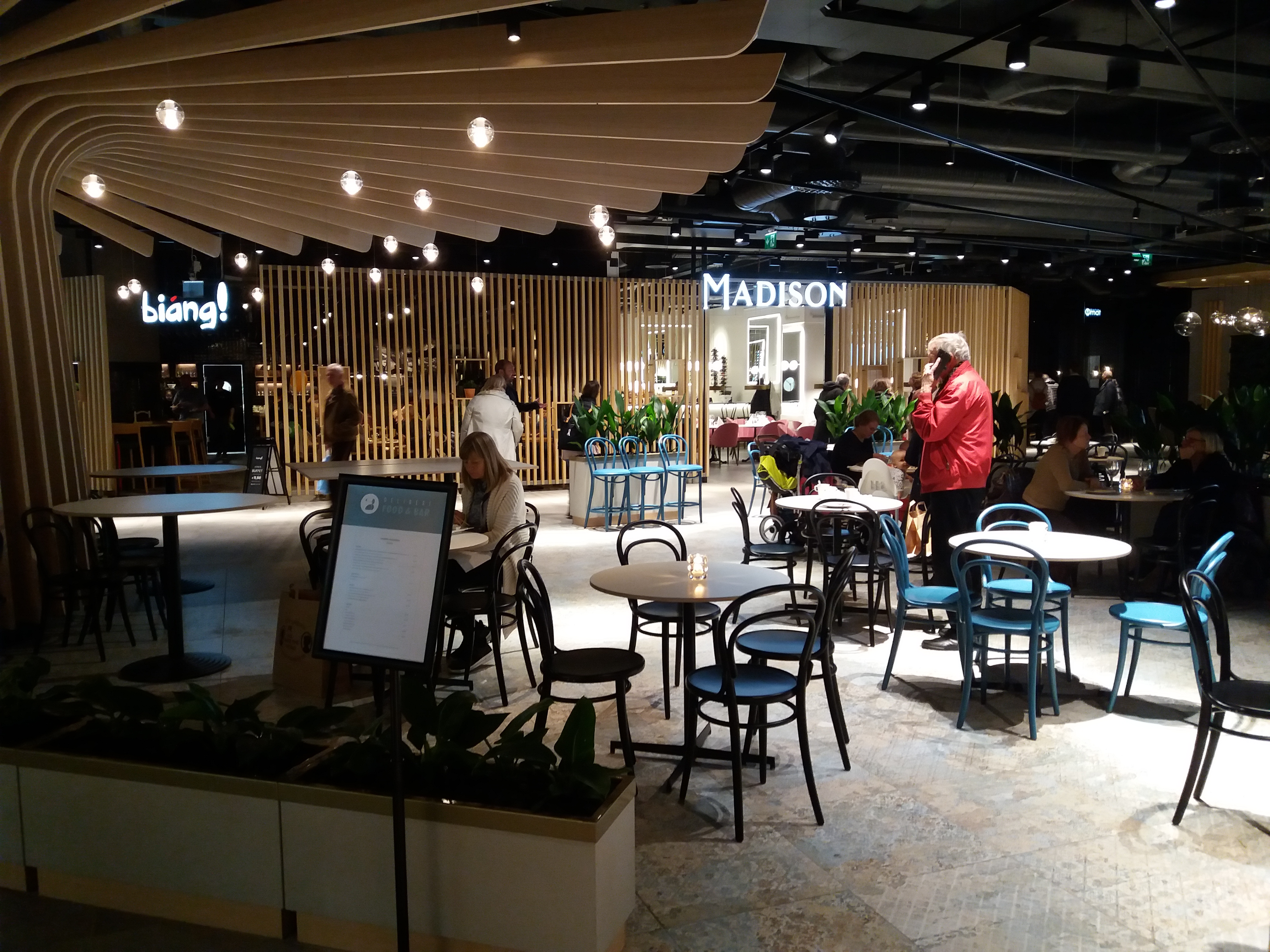
Food garden at Ainoa shopping centre.

Finland's first shopping centre, Heikintori, was opened in Tapiola in 1968. The Tapiola centre has a large selection of services: a department store (Stockmann), a book store (Akateeminen Kirjakauppa), groceries (K-Supermarket, Food Market Herkku), Alko, a post office, banks (Nordea, Danske Bank, Aktia, Osuuspankki, Ålandsbanken, Handelsbanken and Nooa Säästöpankki), photography stores, barber's shops, and other small businesses. Public services include the Tapiola health centre, a library, an employment bureau.

=== Public transportation ===
Public transport in Tapiola consists of buses and the metro maintained by the Helsinki Regional Transport Authority. The Tapiola metro station, a station of the Helsinki Metro, opened as a part of Länsimetro (the Western Metro Extension) in November 2017.

=== Sports services ===
The Tapiola centre houses a swimming pool and the Tapiola bowling alley. Near the centre is also the Tapiola tennis park. In the Tuulimäki defense shelter there are premises for wrestling, judo, shooting (air guns and archery), table tennis, gymnastics and fencing. There is also a boxing ring in connection to the Tuulimäki gymnasium. In western Tapiola there is the Tapiola sports park, housing the ice hockey rink, skating rink and the tennis centre. The name Tapiola comes from a competition held by the apartment foundation. The lands originally belonged to the Hagalund mansion.

== Buildings ==
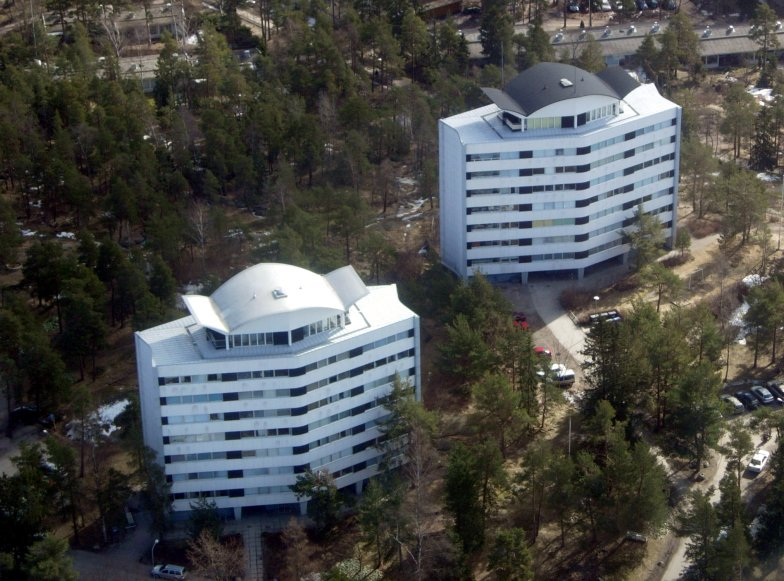
The so-called "Hip flask houses", designed by Viljo Revell

In the centre of Tapiola, next to the central pool, there is the Tapiola Garden hotel, designed by Aarne Ervi. In autumn 2005, the highest wooden office building in Europe, called the Modular-office, was built in southern Tapiola by next to the Länsiväylä highway. The building is operated by Finnforest.

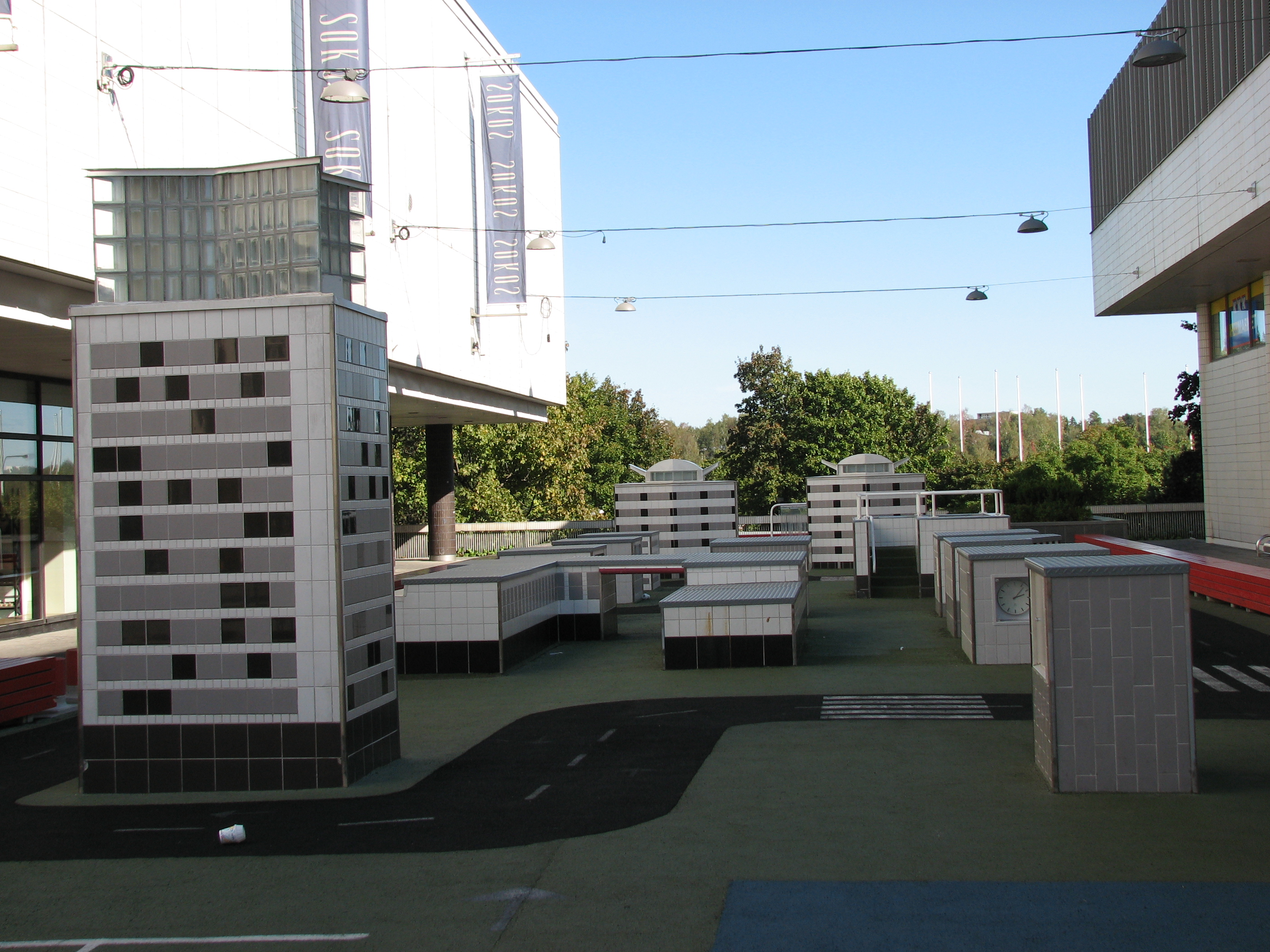
Tapiola centre has a playground that features miniature versions of some of the iconic buildings in Tapiola.

Tapiola is also the name of a Finnish insurance company, presumably from the location of its headquarters. Among other major companies headquartered in Tapiola are Huhtamäki and M-real.

In Otsolahti in eastern Tapiola, there is a small boat harbour for motor boats.

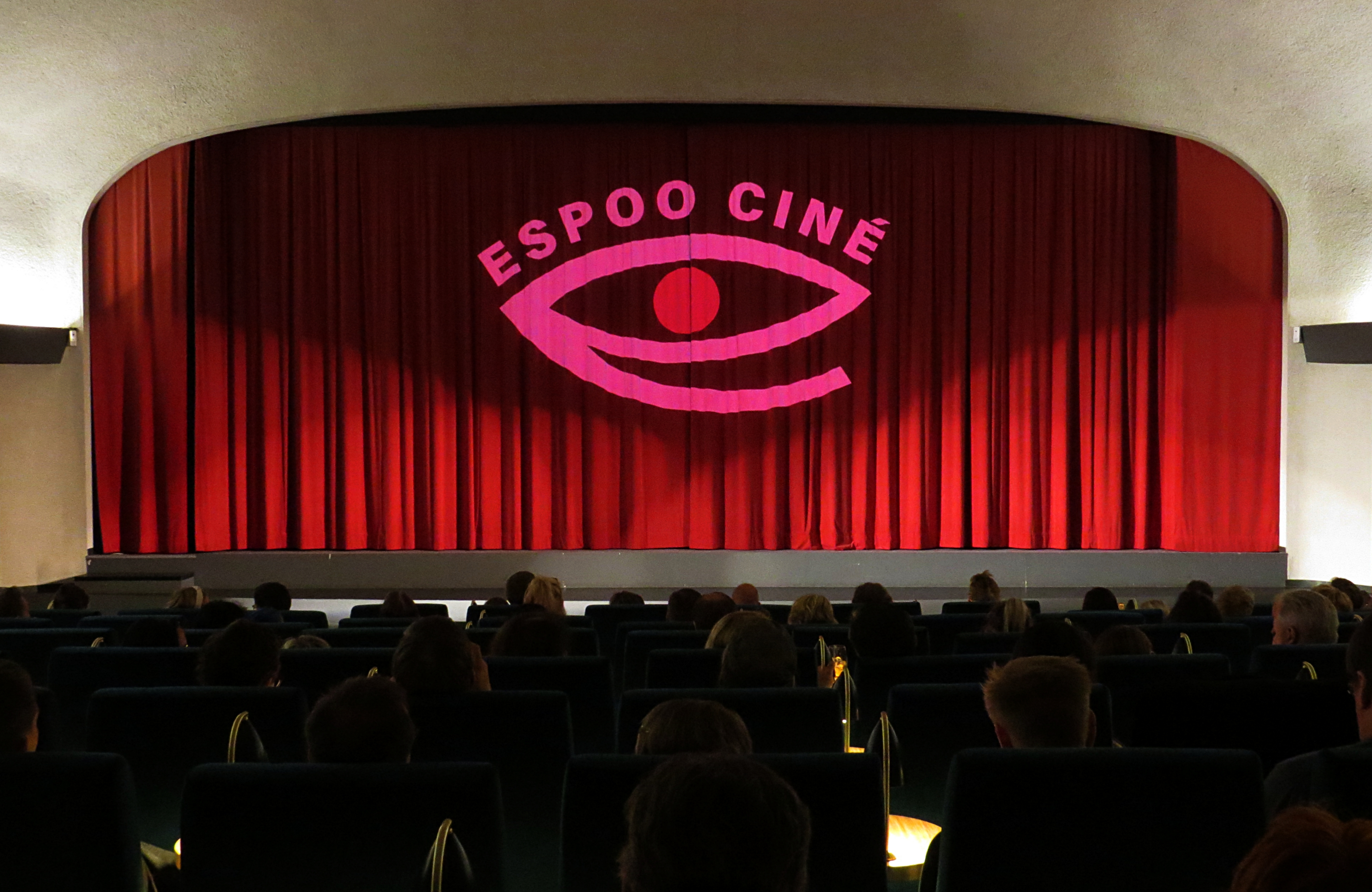
Kino Tapiola movie theater by Aarne Ervi

The Itäkartano area east of the Tapiola centre is famous for its apartment buildings built in the 1950s, visited by architects from all around the world. The Itäkartano centre operated as the centre of the whole district of Tapiola before the current central area was built. Remnants of this central role include Tapiola's cinema, Kino Tapiola, by the Mäntyviita street, and office apartments. The area belongs to the Finnish museum bureau's list of significant cultural environments. The highest, oldest, and most significant building in the area is the white, 11-storey Mäntytorni building.

To the north of Tapiola centre is a central park, Silkkiniitty, a large grass field reaching to Pohjois-Tapiola. It is popular among sportspeople and sunbathers.

According to the Finnish museum bureau, Tapiola is a unique phenomenon in the world. According to the bureau, new proposed changes to the city planning threaten the existence of this cultural heritage.

The WeeGee house, designed by architect Aarno Ruusuvuori and completed in 1964, is the former printing house of the Weilin+Göös publishing house. It currently hosts the Espoo Museum of Modern Art (EMMA), the Espoo City Museum, the Helinä Rautavaara Museum, the Finnish Museum of Horology, the Finnish Toy Museum, Galleria AARNI, and other cultural institutions.

Tapiola has its own metro station, the Tapiola metro station. The station was opened in November 2017.

== Controversies ==
The founder of the Garden City Tapiola, Heikki von Hertzen, considered suing the insurance company Tapiola in 1981 for stealing the trade name of Tapiola. The Garden City had used substantial resources in advertisement.

== See also ==
- Tapiola metro station
- Districts of Espoo
