= Tapiola Central Tower =

High-rise building in Espoo, Finland

Coordinates: 60°10′37.14″N 24°48′16.47″E

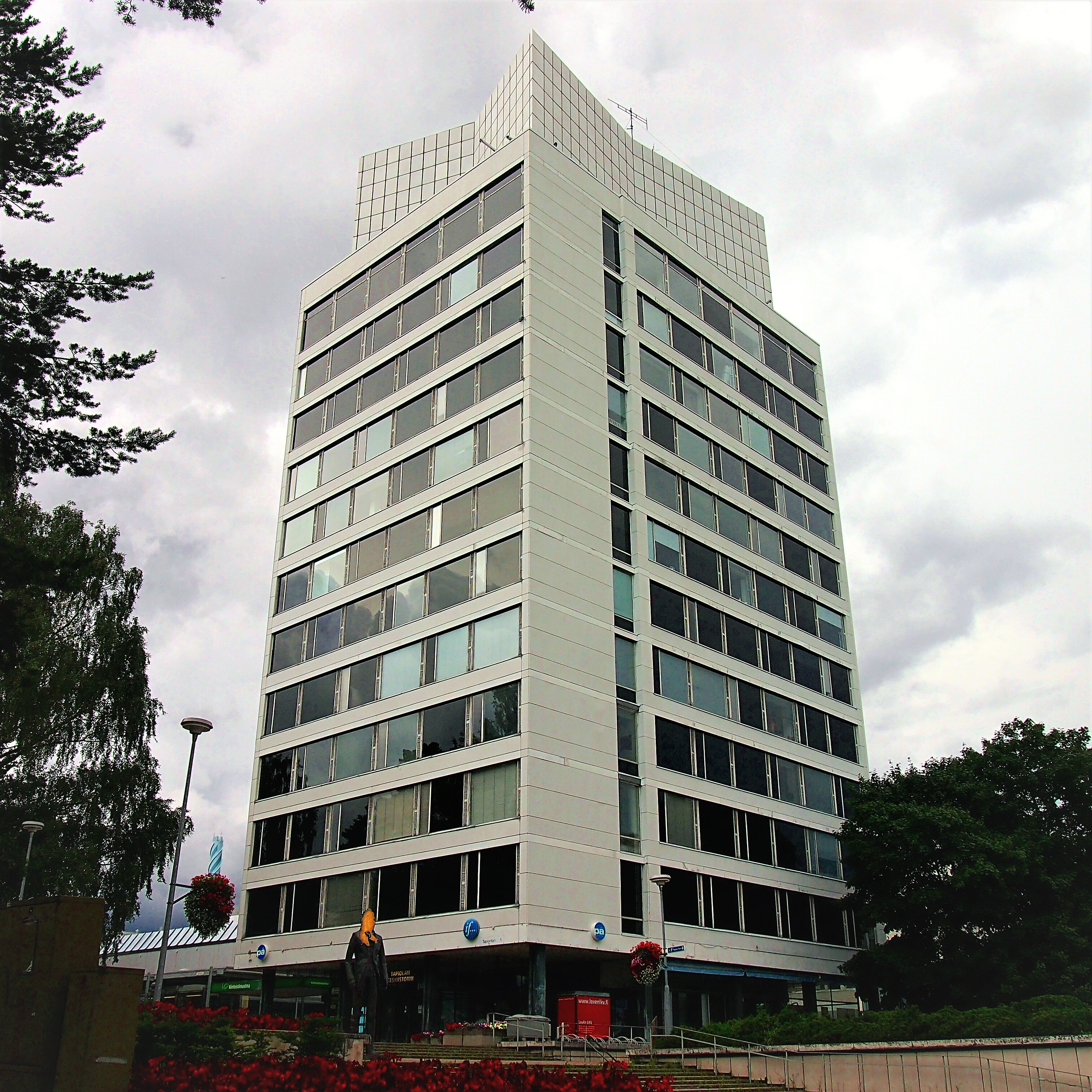
The Tapiola Central Tower in summer 2016

The Tapiola Central Tower (Finnish: Tapiolan keskustorni) is a high-rise building at the centre of the Tapiola garden city in northeastern Espoo, Finland. The tower is 49 metres (161 ft) high and has 13 floors. It has a total floor space of 5,600 m^{2} (60,000 sq ft). The tower was designed by architect Aarne Ervi and it was completed officially on September 15, 1961. Construction of the tower started in 1958. The tower was originally known as Konttoritorni ("office tower").

Originally the bottom floors of the tower hosted business spaces, while the top floors hosted offices and bureaus. The twelfth floor hosted restaurant Linnunrata for a long time. The top floor is contracted and hosted panorama restaurant Kultakukko.

The Tapiola Central Tower is coated with enameled steel.

Many scenes in 1960s-era Finnish films where shot at the panorama restaurant of the Tapiola Central Tower.
