= Otto-Iivari Meurman =

Finnish architect (1890–1994)

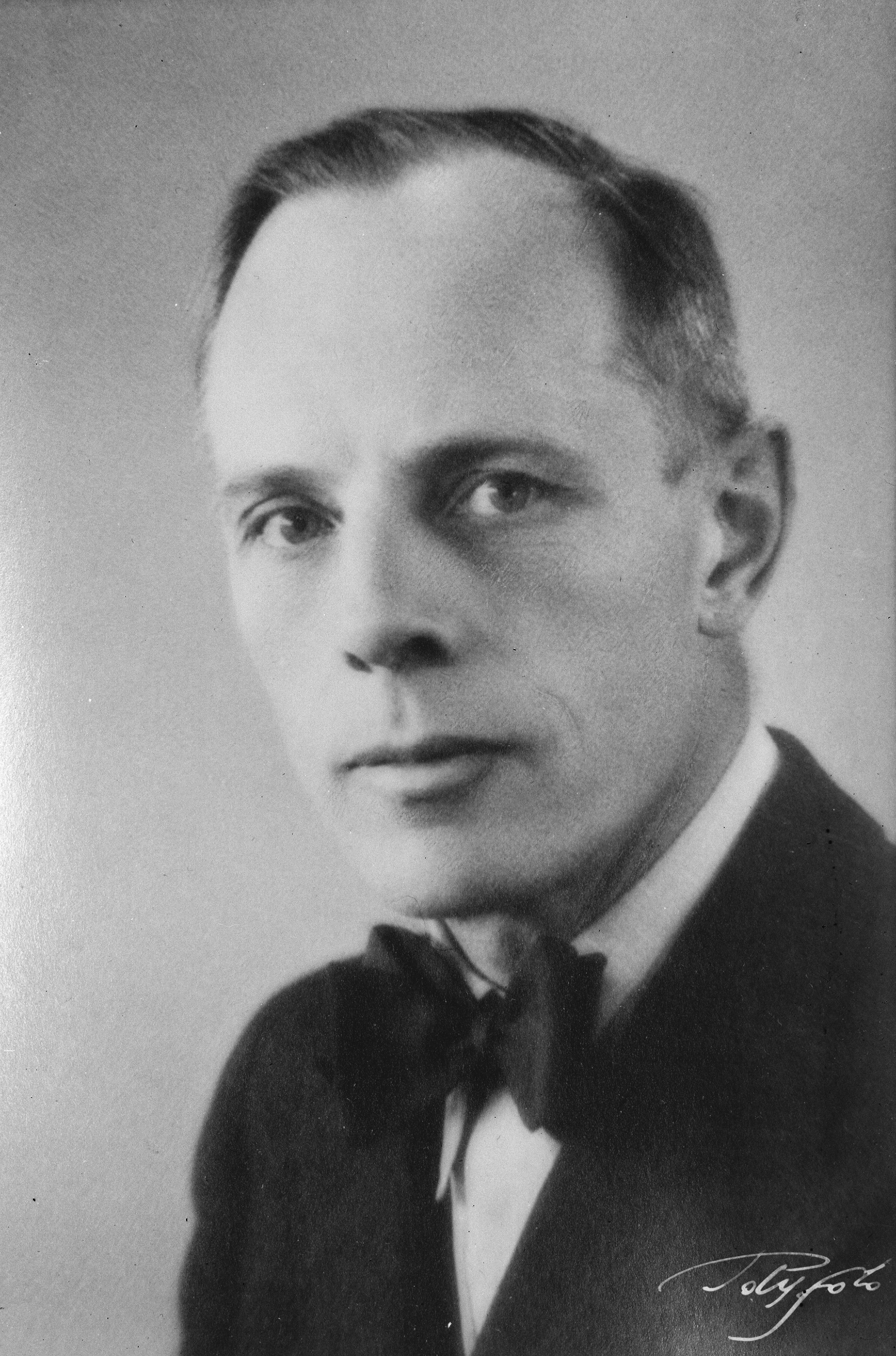
Otto-Iivari Meurman

Otto-Iivari Meurman (4 June 1890, in Ilmajoki – 19 August 1994, in Helsinki) was a Finnish architect. He did city plans for Kauniainen and Tapiola.

Garden city Tapiola was based on town planning of Meurman. Meurman resigned the Tapiola project when high houses were allowed in the area. Internationally garden cities do not include them.

He wrote: Rock can be broken in short time, but you can not get it back artificially. Nature must be respected, and should be touched cautiously. By this way nature and humans can create brilliant work, that prove good national sense and civilized nature. ((in Finnish) "Kallio on lyhyessä ajassa rikki räjäytetty, mutta uutta ei sen tilalle voi keinotekoisesti saada. Luontoa on kunnioitettava, ja siihen on kajottava varovasti. Silloin luonto ja ihminen voivat loihtia suurenmoisia töitä, jotka todistavat tekijänsä ja kansakunnan hyvää aistia ja korkeaa sivistystasoa.")

Meurman's concept of the nuclear family and its necessary place in society was prevalent in his career.
