= Espoo Ciné International Film Festival =

- Location: Espoo, Finland
- Language: International
- Website: espoocine.fi/en/

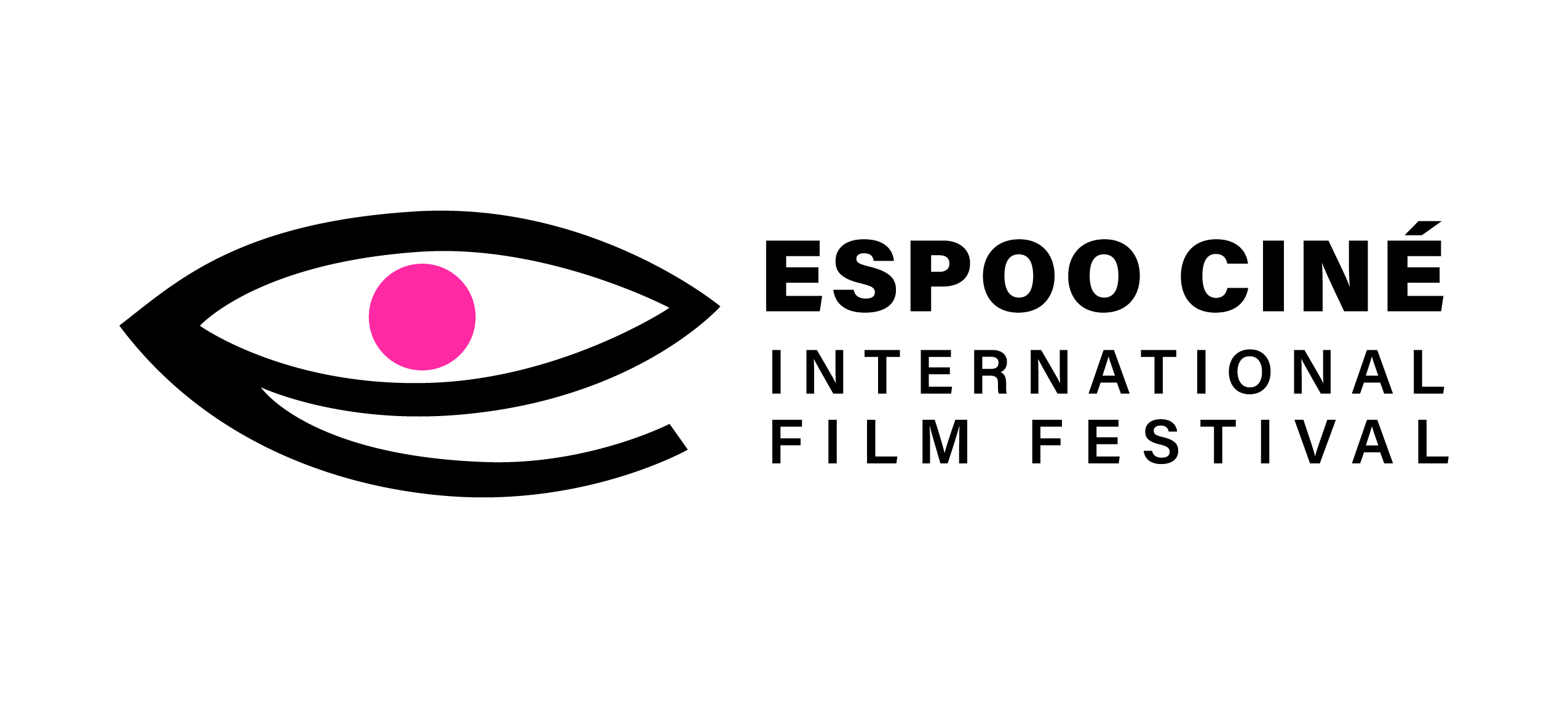
Espoo Ciné International Film Festival logo

Espoo Ciné International Film Festival is an annual event held in Espoo, Finland, in August. The festival was established in 1990 and it has since grown to be one of Finland's leading film festivals, screening about 100 feature films each year in addition to short films.

Espoo Ciné focuses on European cinema and previously there have been series centering on French and Latin cinema, for example. Espoo Ciné also presents a Pink Zone series showing LBGT films as well as one or more outdoor screenings in Tapiola, Espoo. As a member of European Fantastic Film Festivals Federation Espoo Ciné has awarded a Méliès d'Argent prize for best European fantasy film since 1999.
