= Mikonkatu =

Street in Helsinki, Finland

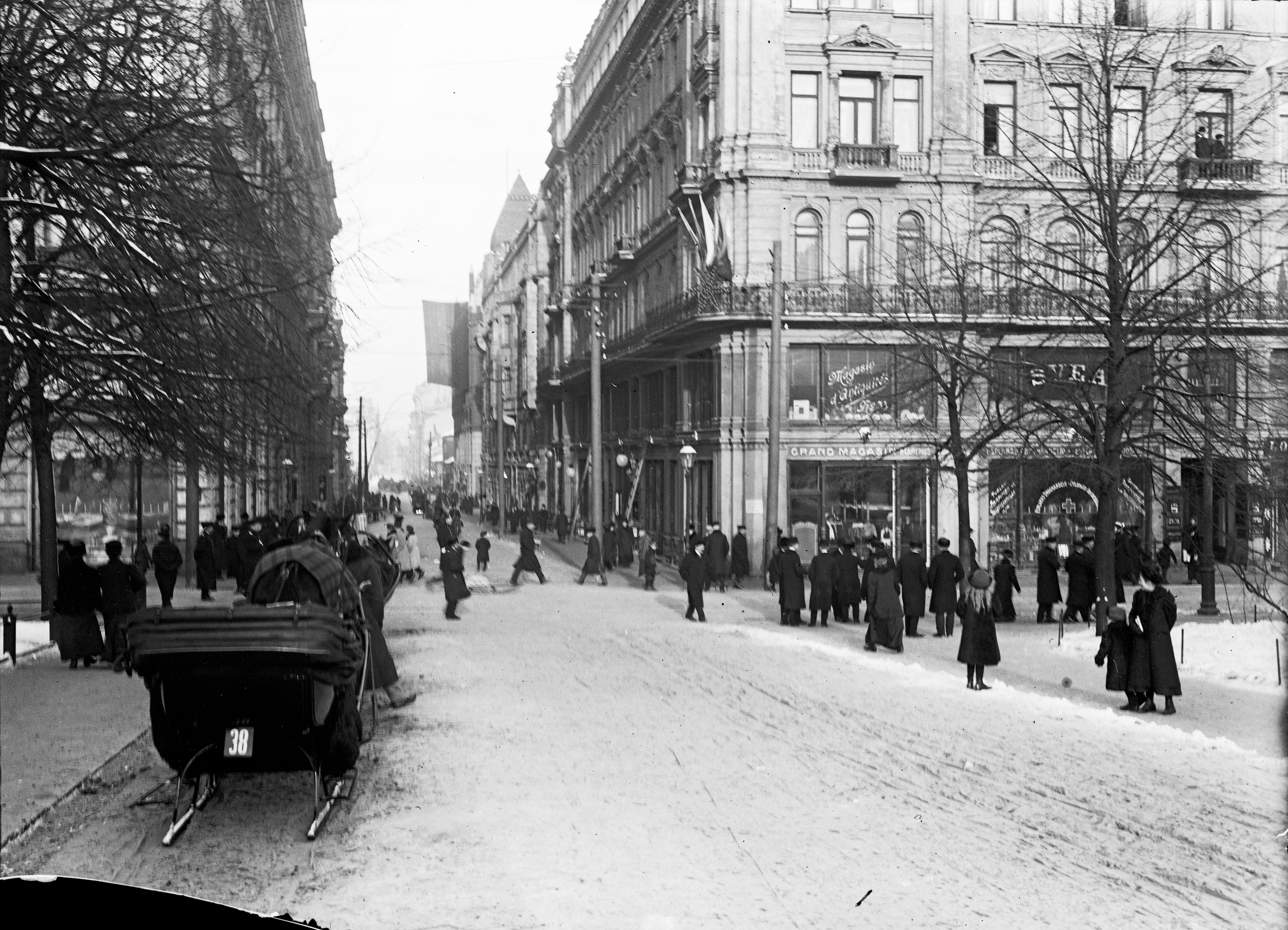
Mikonkatu seen from Esplanadi towards Kaisaniemi in the early 20th century.

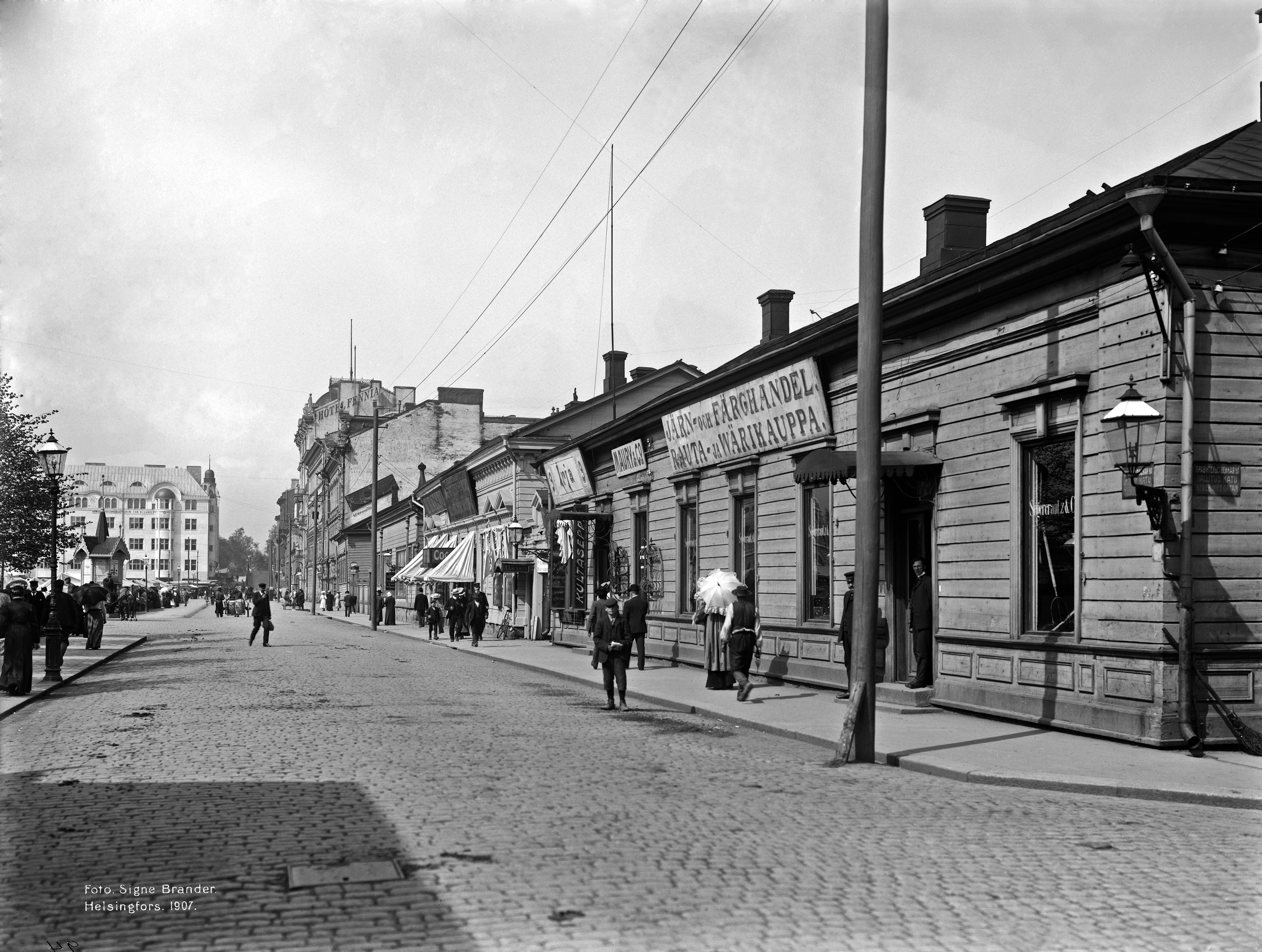
Businesses on Mikonkatu seen towards Kaisaniemi in the 20th century. Photograph by Signe Brander.

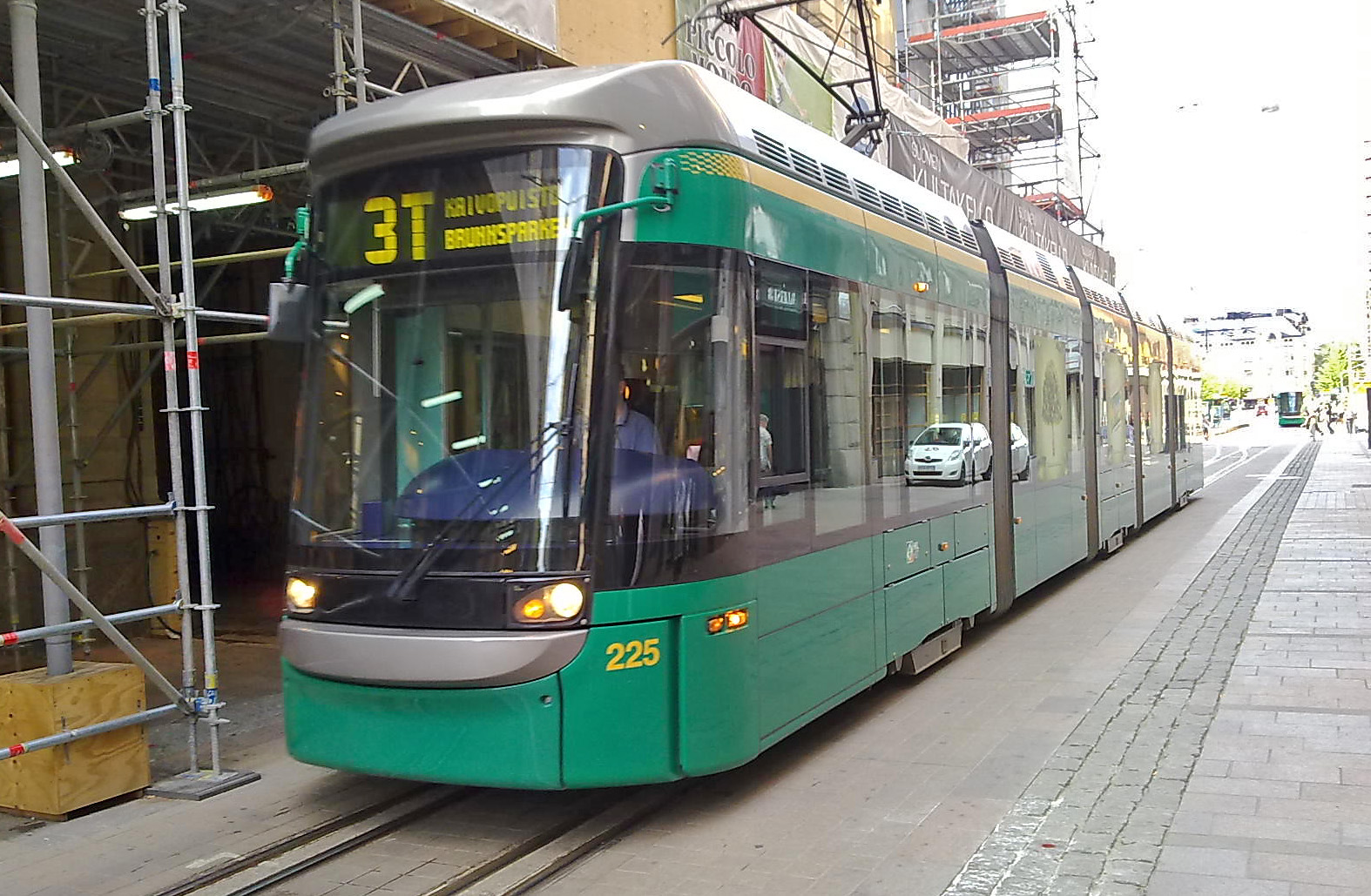
The pedestrian part of Mikonkatu, a tram running between Aleksanterinkatu and Yliopistonkatu.

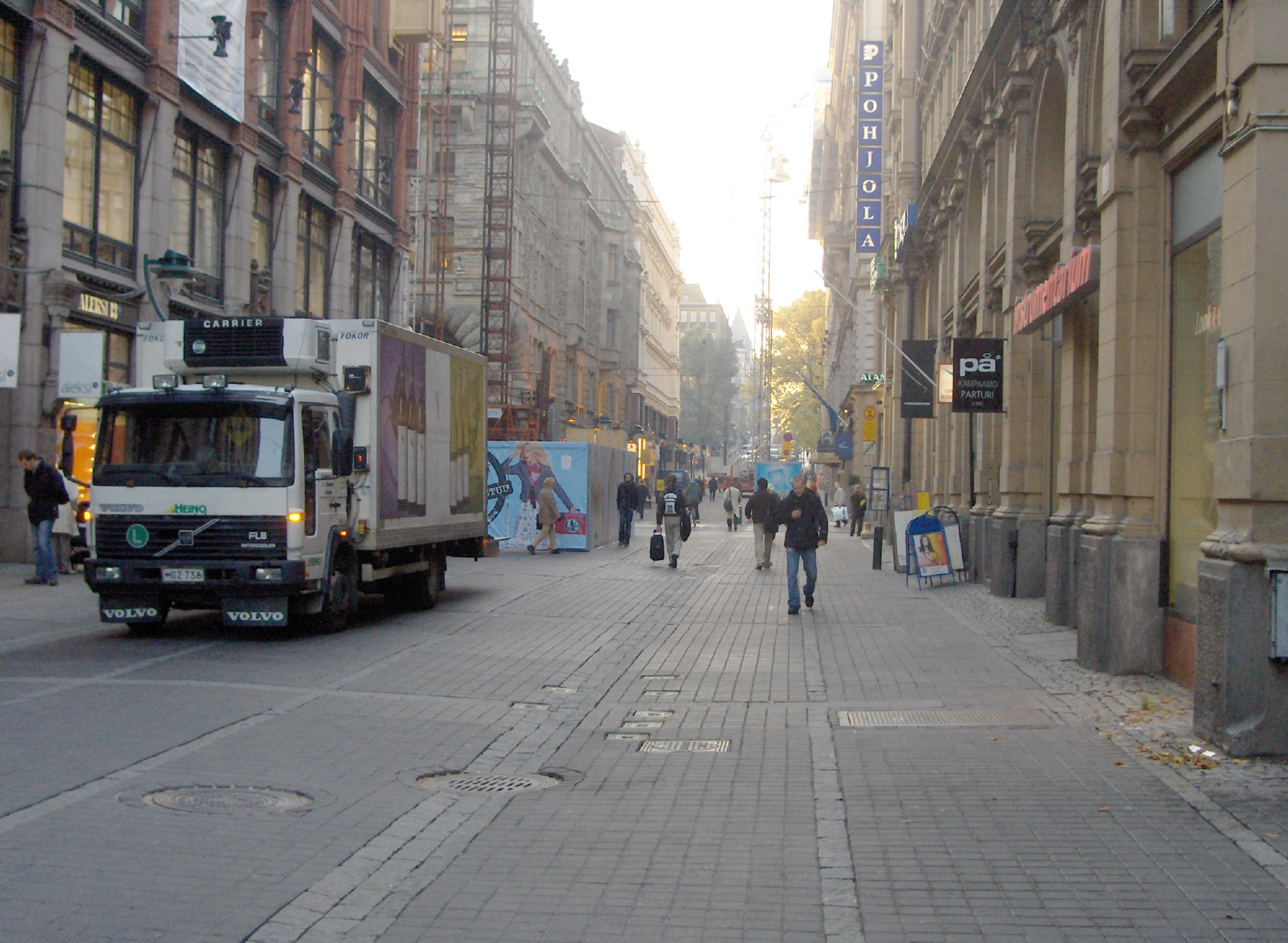
Mikonkatu seen from Yliopistonkatu towards Esplanadi before the tram track was built.

Mikonkatu (Swedish: Mikaelsgatan) is a street in central Helsinki, Finland, leading north from the Esplanadi Park to the Kaisaniemi Park, mostly converted into a pedestrian street in 1992.

Mikonkatu was named in 1820 after Grand Duke Michael Pavlovich of Russia (1798 - 1849), brother of Emperor of Russia Alexander I. The street was built into its current length and form in 1830. The Finnish name of street was Mikaelinkatu from 1909 to 1928.

There are tram tracks on Mikonkatu, going along the eastern edge of the Helsinki Railway Square to Kaivokatu. Trams travelled on this Vilhonkatu - Mikonkatu route in both directions until 1950, when a new route along Kaisaniemenkatu was opened from Kaivokatu towards Kaisaniemi. The trams travelled from Kaisaniemi to Kaivokatu along Vilhonkatu and Mikonkatu until 1994, when the tram track along Kaisaniemenkatu was widened to two lanes. The Vilhonkatu - Mikonkatu route is still used for tram traffic on special occasions.

A two-lane, partly self-intersecting tram track was built on Mikonkatu between Aleksanterinkatu and Kaivokatu in early 2009. Once the Helsinki central service tunnel is ready, it will replace the service traffic on Mikonkatu.

There are plans to cover the part of Mikonkatu between Aleksanterinkatu and Pohjoisesplanadi.

== Intersections from south to north ==
- Aleksanterinkatu
- Ateneuminkuja (west) / Yliopistonkatu (east)
- Kaivokatu (west) / Kaisaniemenkatu (east)
- The Helsinki Railway Square is located west of Mikonkatu between Kaivokatu and Vilhonkatu.
- Vilhonkatu

== Buildings from south to north ==
The Merkurius building (Mikonkatu 1 - Pohjoisesplanadi 33), also known as the Böckermann house, is a six-story business and office building in the Antilooppi block. The building was commissioned from 1888 to 1890 by the merchant A.F. Böckermann and the master builder H.W. Nordberg and designed by the architect Selim A. Lindqvist with help from the architect Elia Heikel.

The Wrede house (Mikonkatu 2 - Pohjoisesplanadi 35) in the Gaselli block, designed by the architect Karl August Wrede and commissioned by the master builder J.H. Helenius in 1888, is a five-story business and residential building. The Wrede passage, the first arcade in Helsinki, runs through it.

The Pohjola Insurance building (Mikonkatu 3 - Aleksanterinkatu 44) in the Antilooppi block was completed in 1901 designed by the architect bureau Gesellius, Lindgren, Saarinen. The facade of the building is an example of national romanticist stone architecture. The cast stone ornaments designed by sculptor Hilda Flodin represent the flora and fauna of Finnish national poetry.

The Central house (Mikonkatu 4 - Aleksanterinkatu 46) in the Gaselli block was built as a continuation of the Wrede house in autumn 1890. The commissioner of this business building was Julius Tallberg and the plans had been made by architect K.A. Wrede in the previous year. After the Central house had been completed the Wrede passage had a continuous stretch from Pohjoisesplanadi to Aleksanterinkatu.

The Lundqvist Building (Mikonkatu 5 - Aleksanterinkatu 13) in the Hamsteri block was completed in 1900, designed by architect Selim A. Lindqvist. The Aleksi 13 department store which was present in the building for a long time got its name from the address of the building.

The Atlas house (Mikonkatu 6 - Aleksanterinkatu 15) in the Jänis block was designed by architect Gustaf Nyström in 1889 and was completed in 1890. The inner courtyard buildings were designed by architect C. Kiseleff in 1876 and by the architectural bureau Kiseleff & Heikel in 1880.

The Salama house is located at Mikonkatu 6 - Aleksanterinkatu 15.

The Agros house (Mikonkatu 7 - Yliopistonkatu 10, formerly Hallituskatu 14) in the Hamsteri block was designed by architect Selim A. Lindqvist in 1909. The Agros house was originally built around a small warehouse designed by architect Waldemar Aspel in 1903, which remained part of the building until its last renovation. The building is also known by the name of the Renlund hardware store which was located in the building for a long time.

The Aikatalo building (Mikonkatu 8 - Ateneuminkuja corner) was designed by architect Eliel Muoniovaara in 1961 and there is a pedestrian connection to Keskuskatu next to it.

The architecture competition for the former office of the Atlas bank (Mikonkatu 9 - Yliopistonkatu 7) was won by architects Jussi and Toivo Paatela. The building was originally designed with five floors, but it was built with eight floors. The facade sculptures and the reliefs on the main door were designed by Gunnar Finne. The interior of the bank was designed by Arttu Brummer and the interior decorative paintings were made by Antti Salmenlinna. The bank went bankrupt in the early 1930s, after which the movie theatre Bio Rea took over the premises in 1936.

Further buildings:

- Ateneum (Mikonkatu 10 - Kaivokatu 2)
- Lackman house (Mikonkatu 11)
- Mikonkatu 13 - Kaisaniemenkatu 1
- Mikonlinna, Nokia house (Mikonkatu 15 - Kaisaniemenkatu 2a)
- Fennia house (Mikonkatu 15)
- Former Aatra Oy, Nikolajeff house (Mikonkatu 19 - Vilhonkatu 6)
- Housing company Wilhola
- SOK head office, nowadays Radisson Blu Plaza Hotel
