= Railway Square, Helsinki =

Square in Helsinki, Finland

- Interactive map of Railway Square, Helsinki
- Coordinates: 60°10′16″N 24°56′38″E

The Railway Square (Finnish: Rautatientori, Swedish: Järnvägstorget) is an open square immediately to the east of the Helsinki Central railway station in central Helsinki in Finland. The square serves as Helsinki's secondary bus station along with the main Kamppi Center bus station. The north side features the Finnish National Theatre, and the south side is formed of the Ateneum classical art museum (part of the Finnish National Gallery). To the west side are the two ornate entrances to Helsinki Central station—a bigger one for public use, and a smaller one exclusively for the President of Finland and their official guests. The square is served by the Helsinki Metro system with Rautatientori metro station entrances at the south-west corner, and University of Helsinki metro station to the east.

During summer afternoons and evenings, the pub tram Spårakoff departs from the Mikonkatu tram stop in the square once per hour.

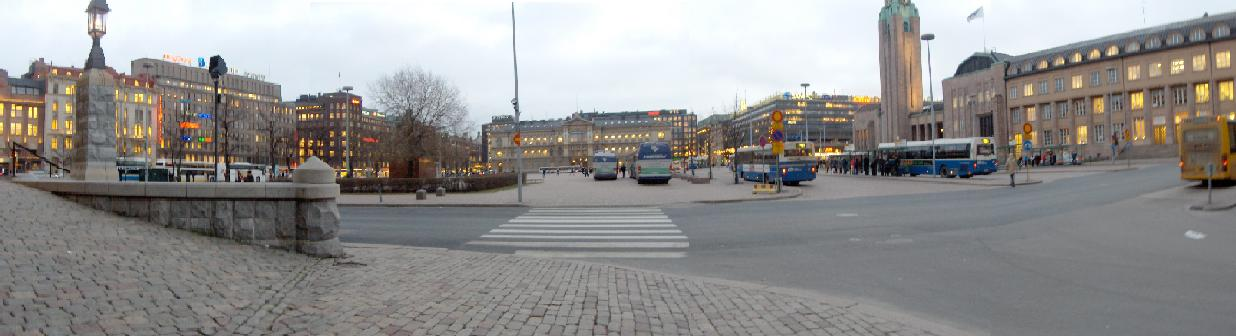

The square is an important transport hub in the Helsinki capital region, as its west edge serves as the terminus of many bus lines travelling both internally in Helsinki and towards Vantaa. The Helsinki tram lines 2, 3/N, 5, 6, 7 and 9/N run along the street Kaivokatu in front of the square.

== History ==
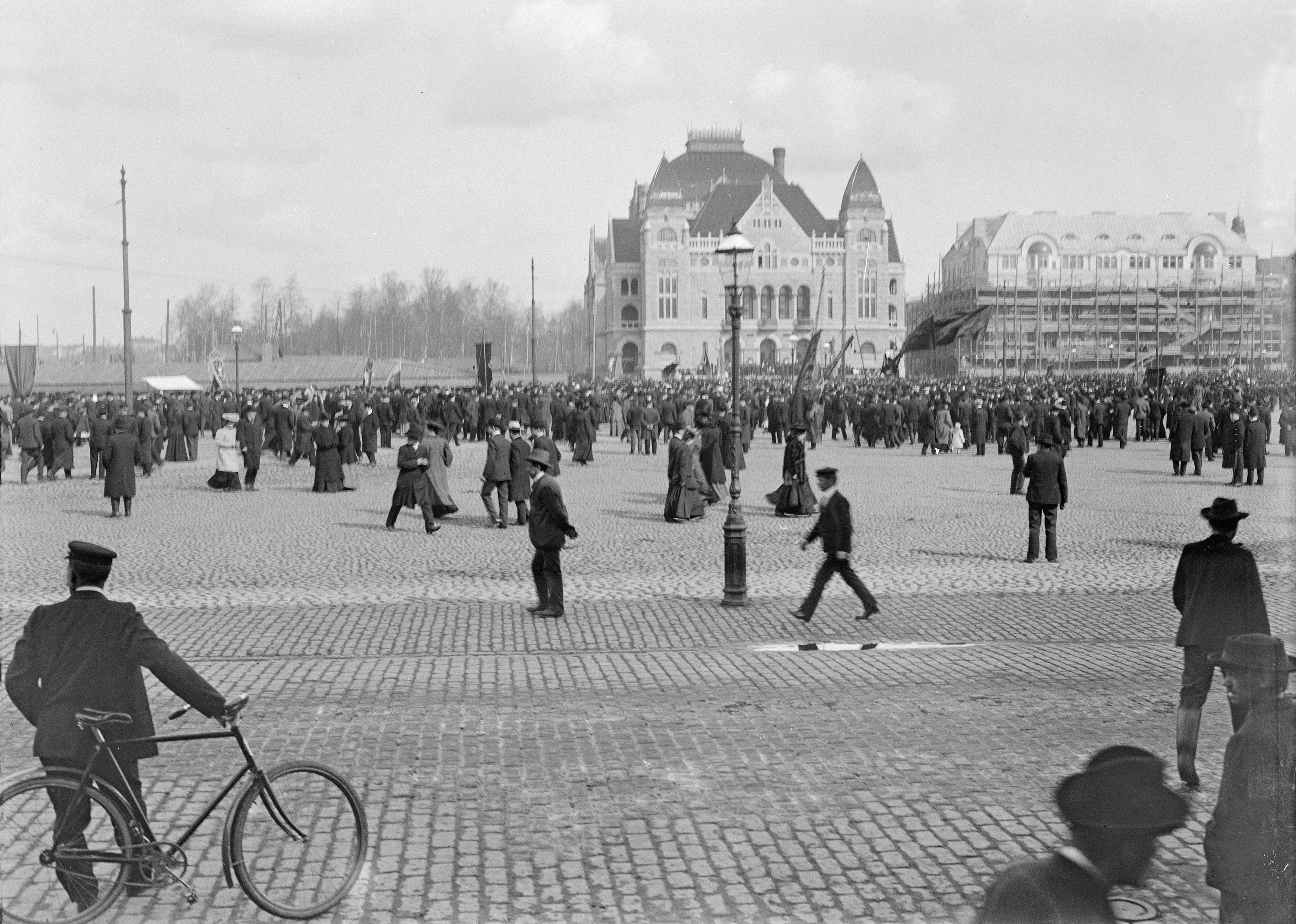
The Railway Square and the Finnish National Theatre in the early 20th century.

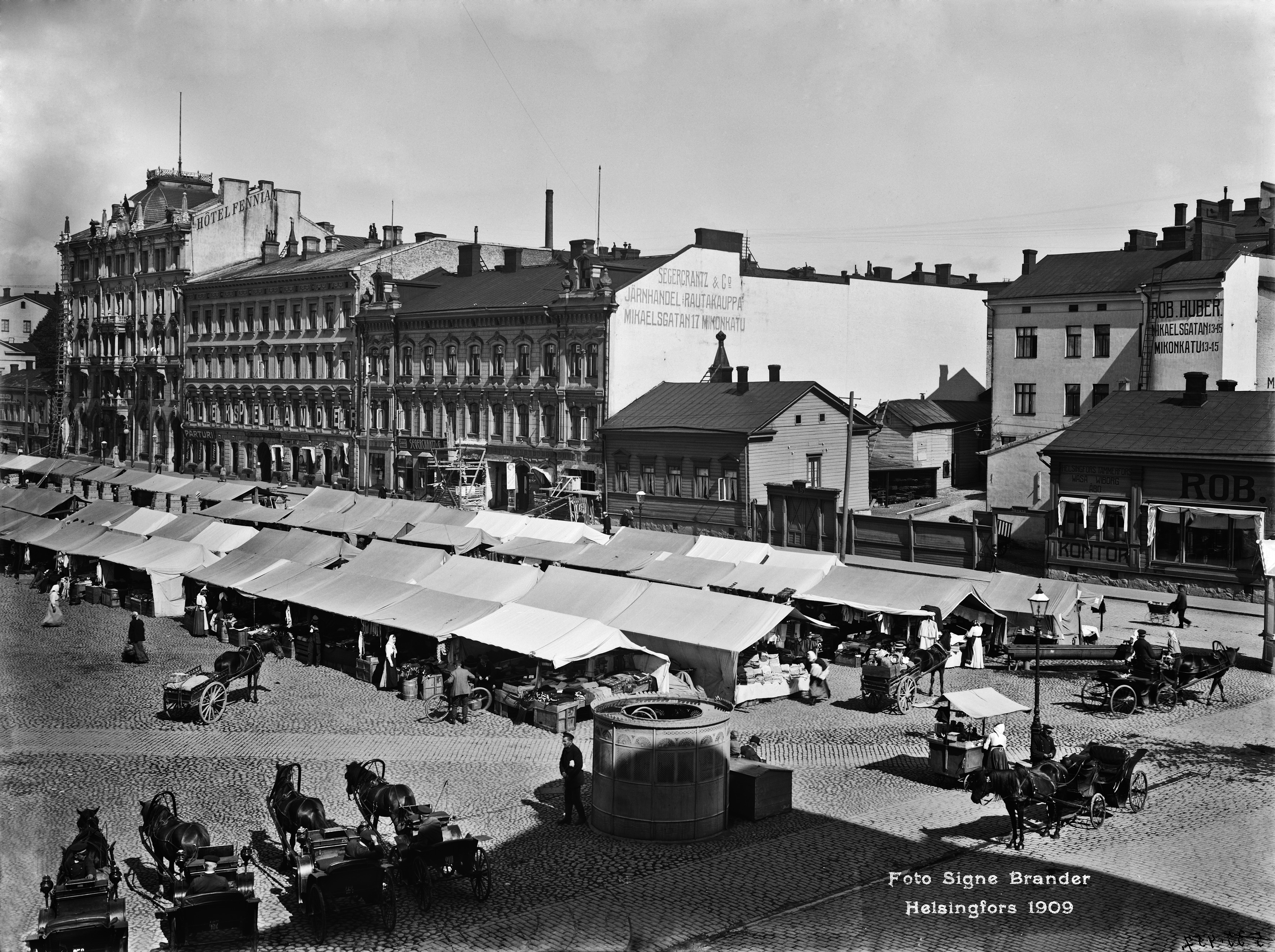
Market activity at the square in 1909.

The site where the Railway Square is located originally used to be covered by the sea, and even in the 19th century the Kluuvinlahti bay was located at its place. A new city block was designed at the site already in the early 19th century, but nothing had been built on it when a new decision was made to leave it as a large open square, when the Helsinki Central railway station was built at the block next to it. When the first station building was built in 1861, the site of the Railway Square was still full of watery wasteland and meadows.

The square served as a market square until 1928. The market activity ended when the square started to be needed for bus transport. At first the market at the square sold firewood and wooden items, in the 20th century mostly wooden utensils, baskets and handicraft. The market stalls were mostly on the east edge of the square, on the Mikonkatu street.

=== Transport ===
The tram lines originally travelled diagonally through the square. In 1910 the tram lines were rerouted to go on the west and north edges of the square along Keskuskatu and Vilhonkatu. In 1935 tram traffic on Kaivokatu started. Terminus stops of bus lines were later placed on the square. At the last times before the Helsinki Metro was taken into use in 1982 and eastern Helsinki transitioned to collective traffic, the square served almost solely as a bus transport hub. Nowadays bus traffic is only served by the western part of the square, while the middle part of the square in front of the Ateneum museum and the Finnish National Theatre has been returned into a pedestrian zone. There have been numerous public events held at the pedestrian zone, such as a concert in support of asylum seekers in March 2017.

=== Neighbouring blocks ===
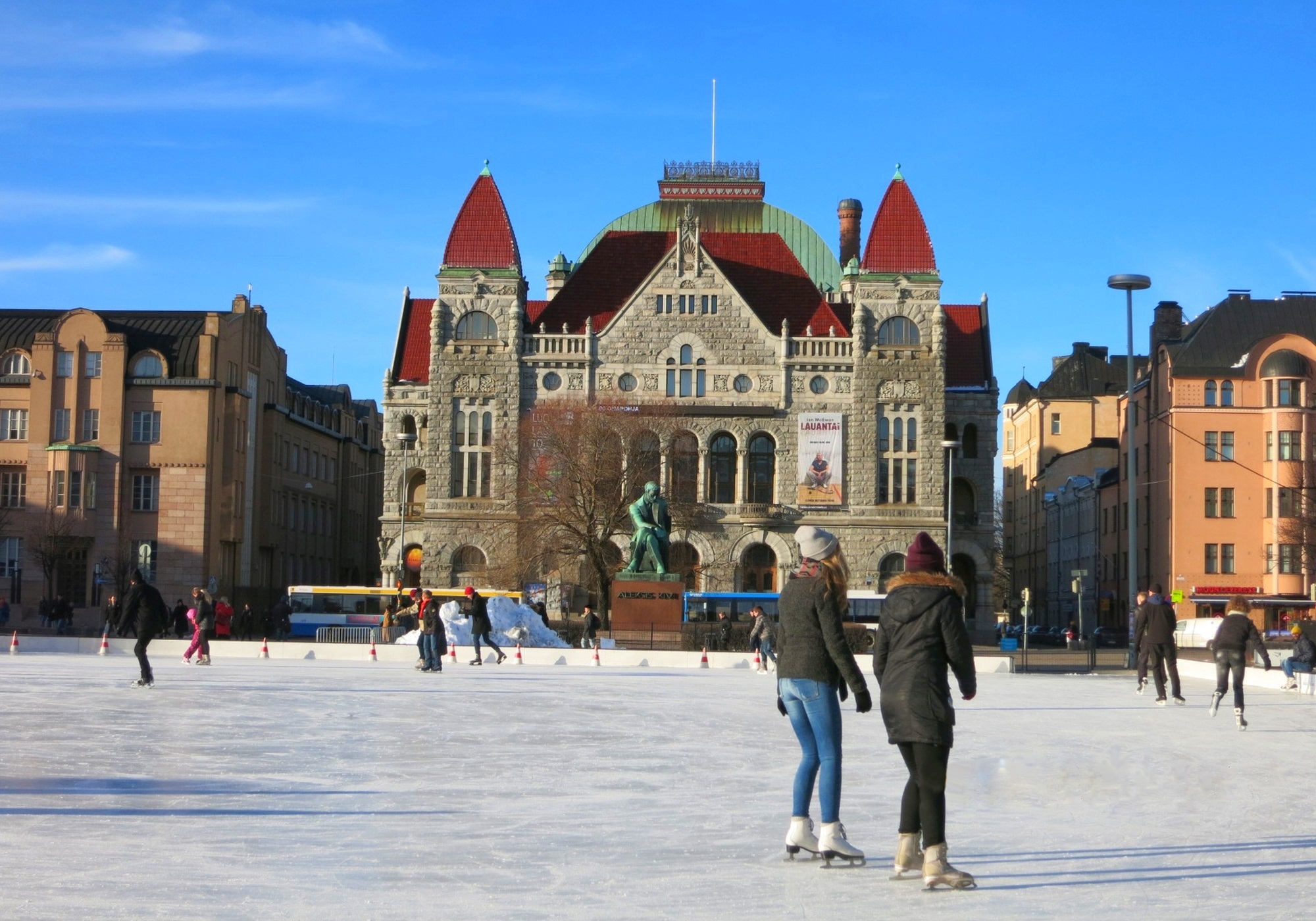
On some winters the square has hosted an ice skating rink with an entry fee.

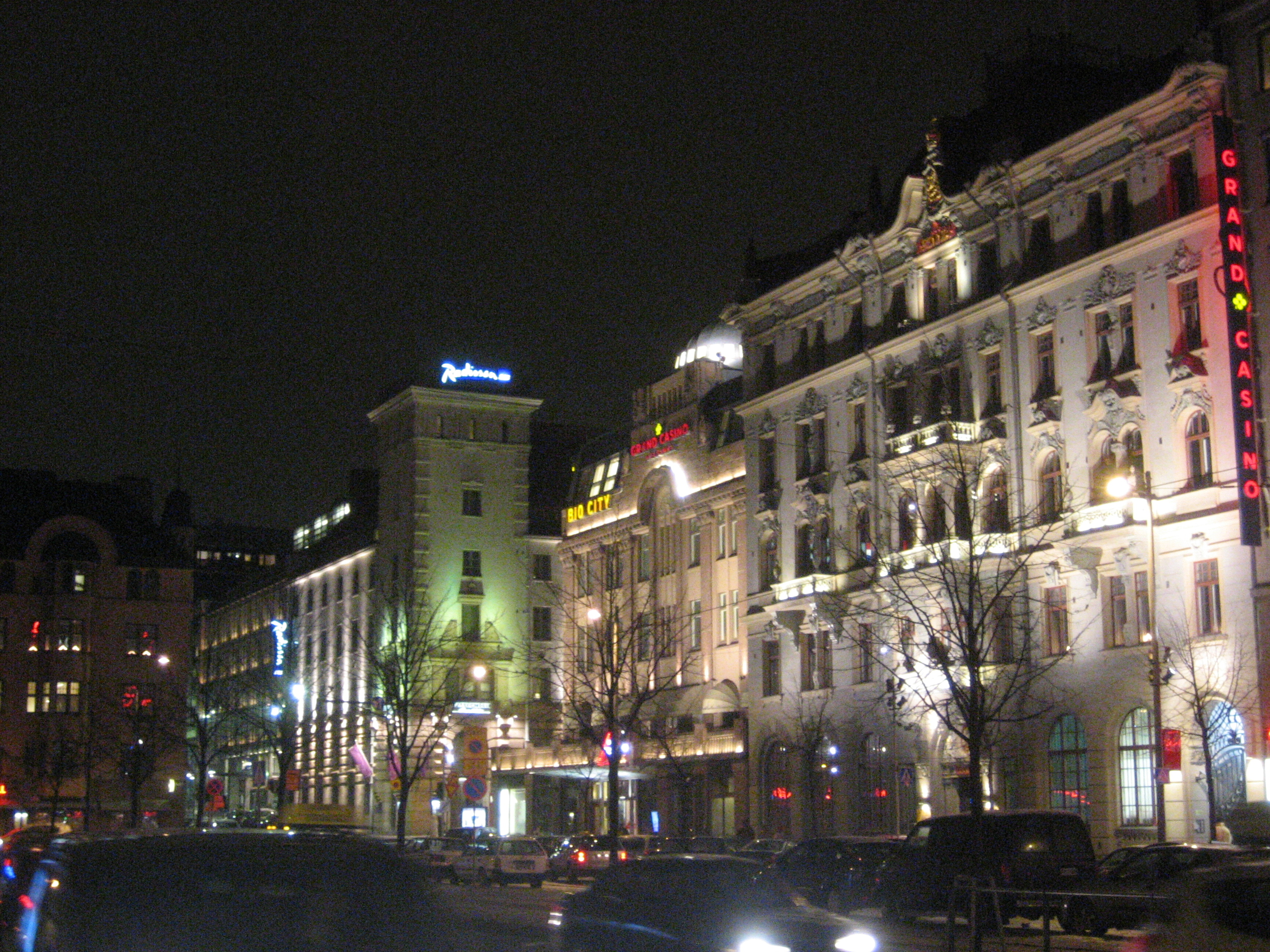
Business buildings on the eastern edge of the square, from the right to the left the Fennia House, the Casino Helsinki and the Radisson Blu Plaza Hotel.

On the eastern side of the square is the Kameeli ("camel", modern spelling "Kameli") block which used to be bisected by the Kaisaniemenkatu street, whose northern facade facing the square is dominated by the Mikonkatu 19 building housing the Casino Helsinki and the Fennia House at Mikonkatu 17, which used to house the famous hotel Grand Hotel Fennia, the most luxurious hotel in Helsinki at the time. Since then the building has housed many successful restaurants such as Aseveliravintola, Vanha Iloinen Fennia, Uusi Iloinen Fennia, Café Metropol and Restaurant Fennia. Nowadays the restaurant space has been joined with the casino. The inner courtyard building at Mikonkatu 17 was demolished in 1988 and replaced with the Kinopalatsi film theatre in 1998.

The corner at Kaisaniemenkatu is dominated by the former Nokia head office Mikonlinna on the northern side and the former Osuuspankkitalo house at Mikonkatu 11-13 on the southern side as well as Mikonkatu 9 on the corner of Yliopistonkatu, which was originally built in 1929 as the head office of the Atlas Bank. The Atlas Bank went on the brink of bankruptcy because of its real estate investments, and already in late 1929 it was joined into the Helsingin Osuuspankki bank. After this, the bank building housed the film theatre Rea for several decades. In the 1970s the space was converted into the computer room of the Helsingin Osakepankki bank and in 1990 to the apartment sales office of the construction company Haka. In 1994 the Planet Hollywood restaurant in Helsinki was opened at the site, with people such as Renny Harlin, Geena Davis, Bruce Willis and Sylvester Stallone attending the opening ceremony. The space functions as a restaurant to this day.

== Asematunneli ==
The Asematunneli space underneath Kaivokatu houses several businesses, a connection to the Rautatientori metro station and underground pedestrian tunnels to the Forum shopping centre, the Sokos department store, the station building and to the City-Center (Makkaratalo) shopping centre.

== Gallery ==
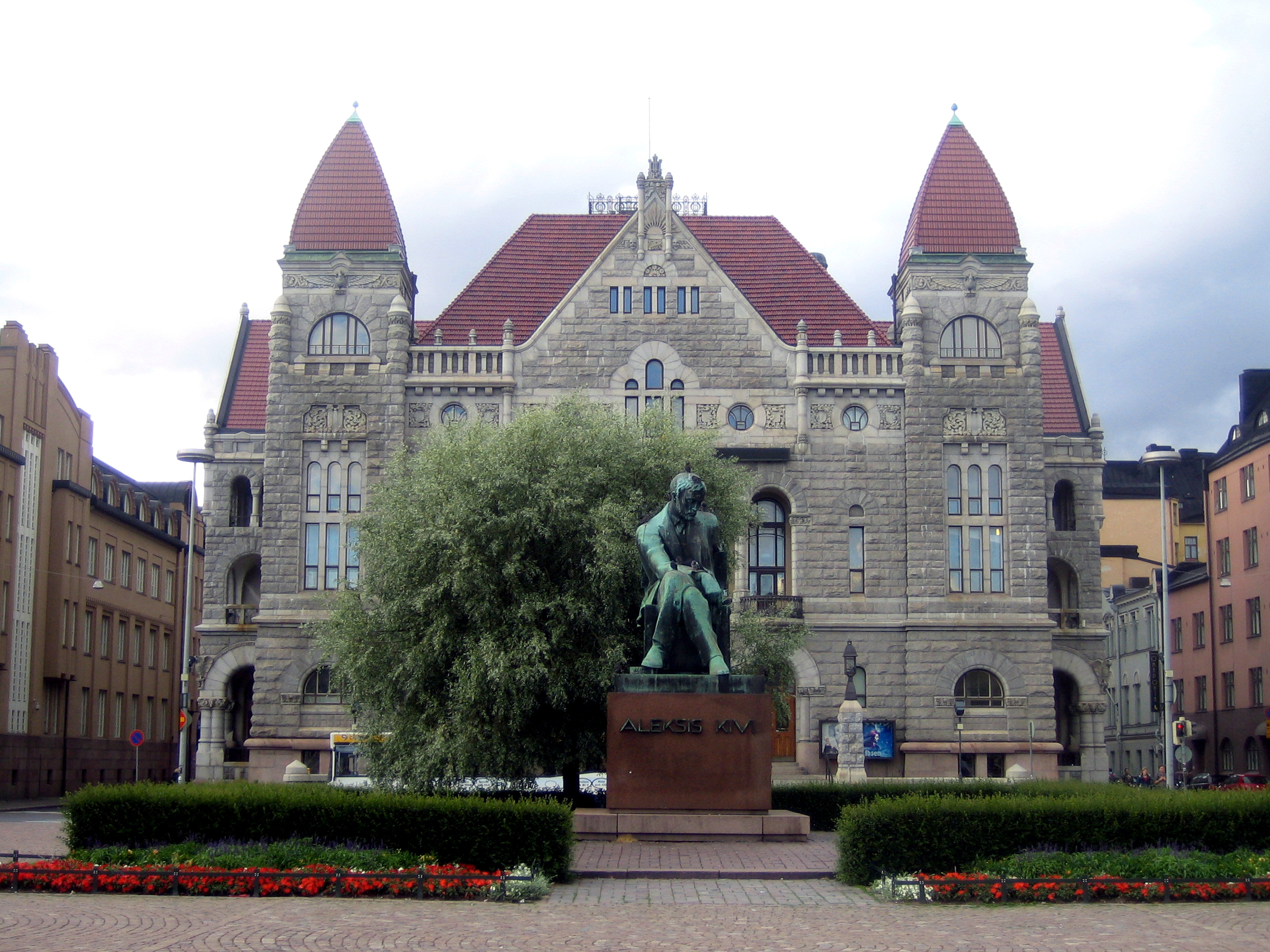
Finnish National Theatre

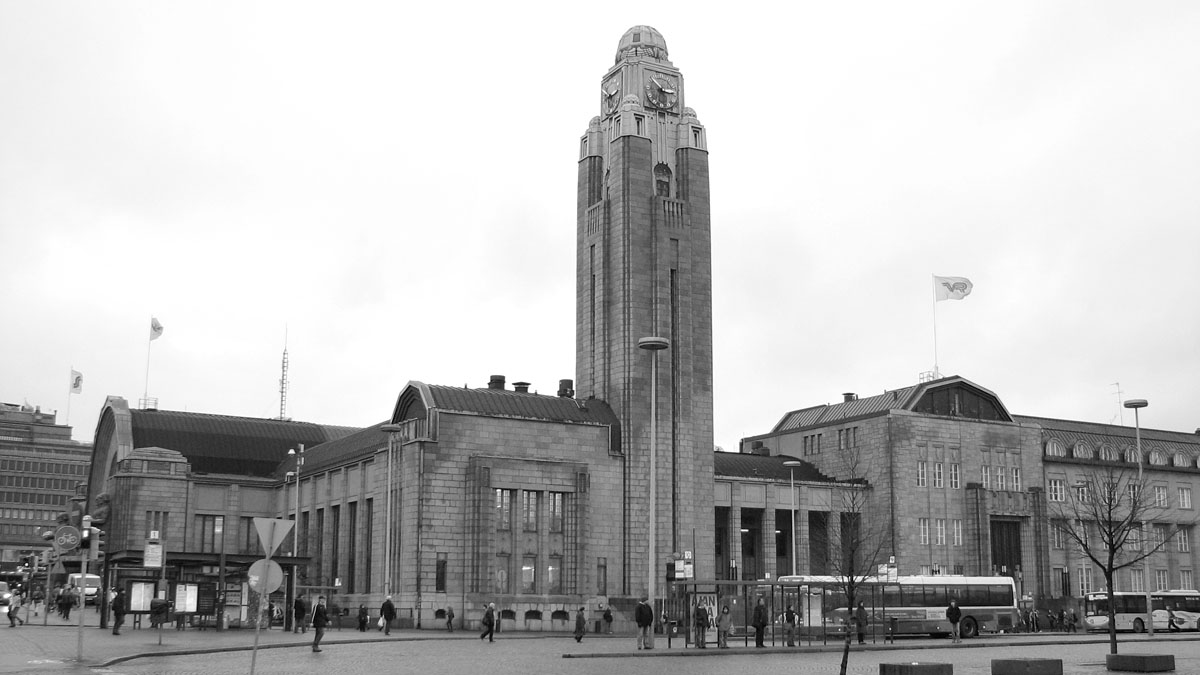
Rautatientori and the Central Railway Station

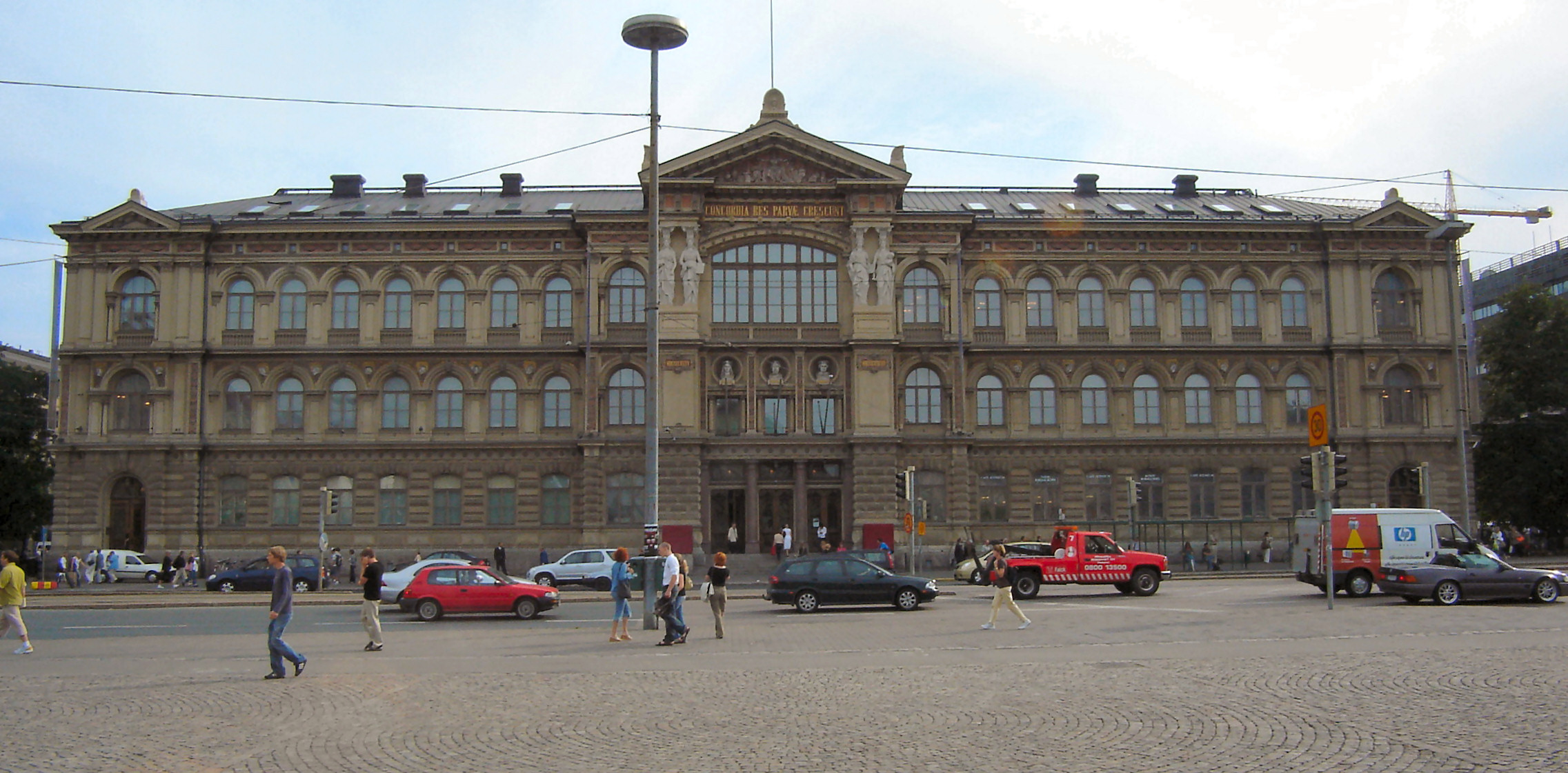
Ateneum, seen from Rautatientori

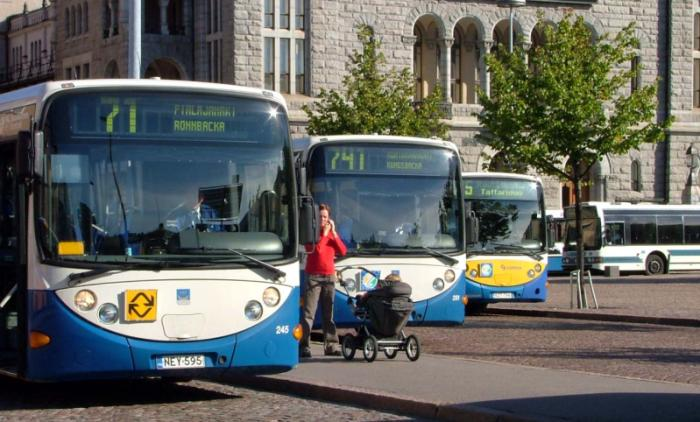
Local buses, serving areas in northeastern Helsinki, and Vantaa

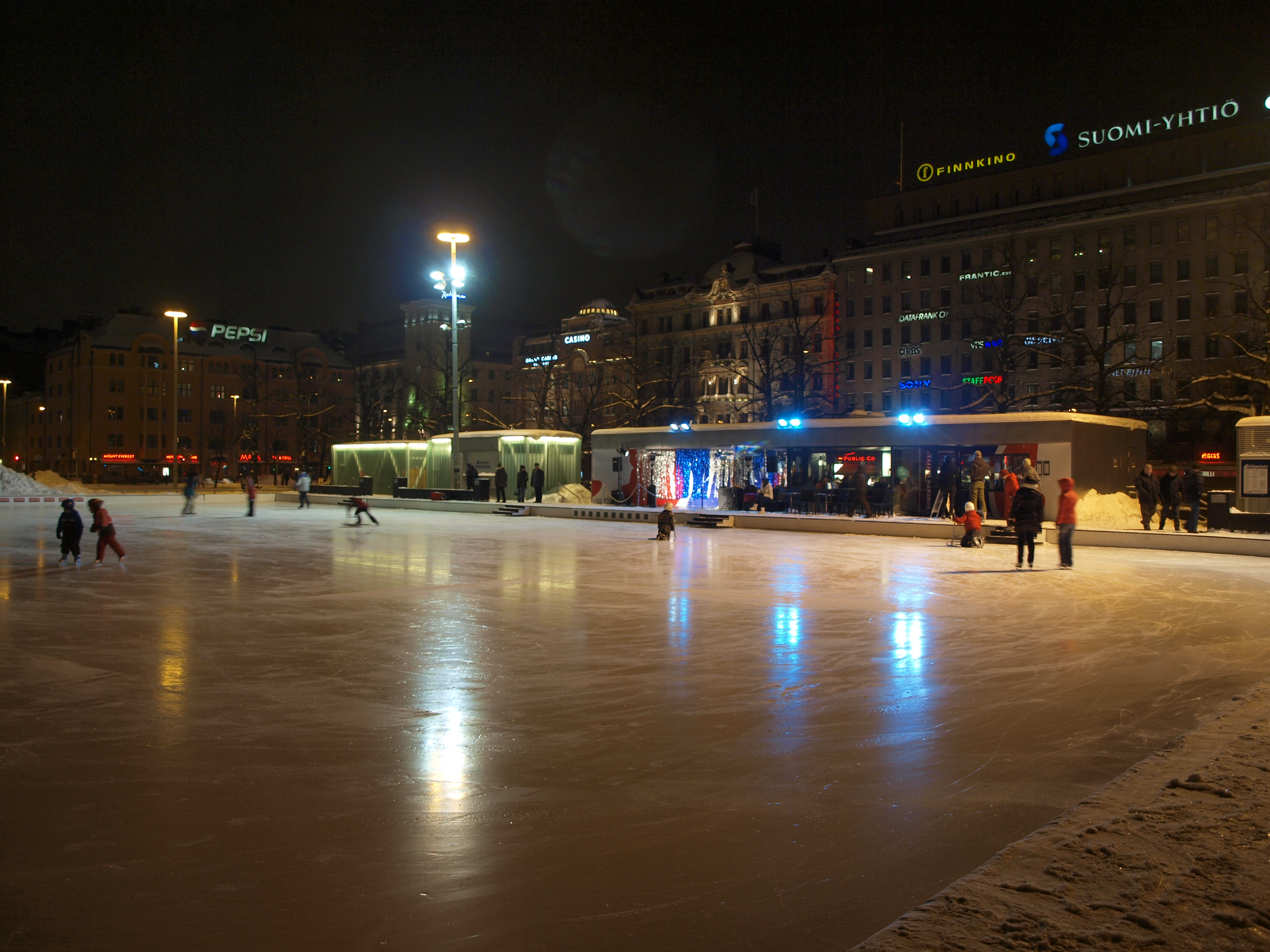
In winter time, the Rautatientori square hosts an ice skating rink.

== See also ==
- Eliel Square
