= Lundqvist Building =

Commercial building in Helsinki

- Lundqvistin liiketalo (Finnish)
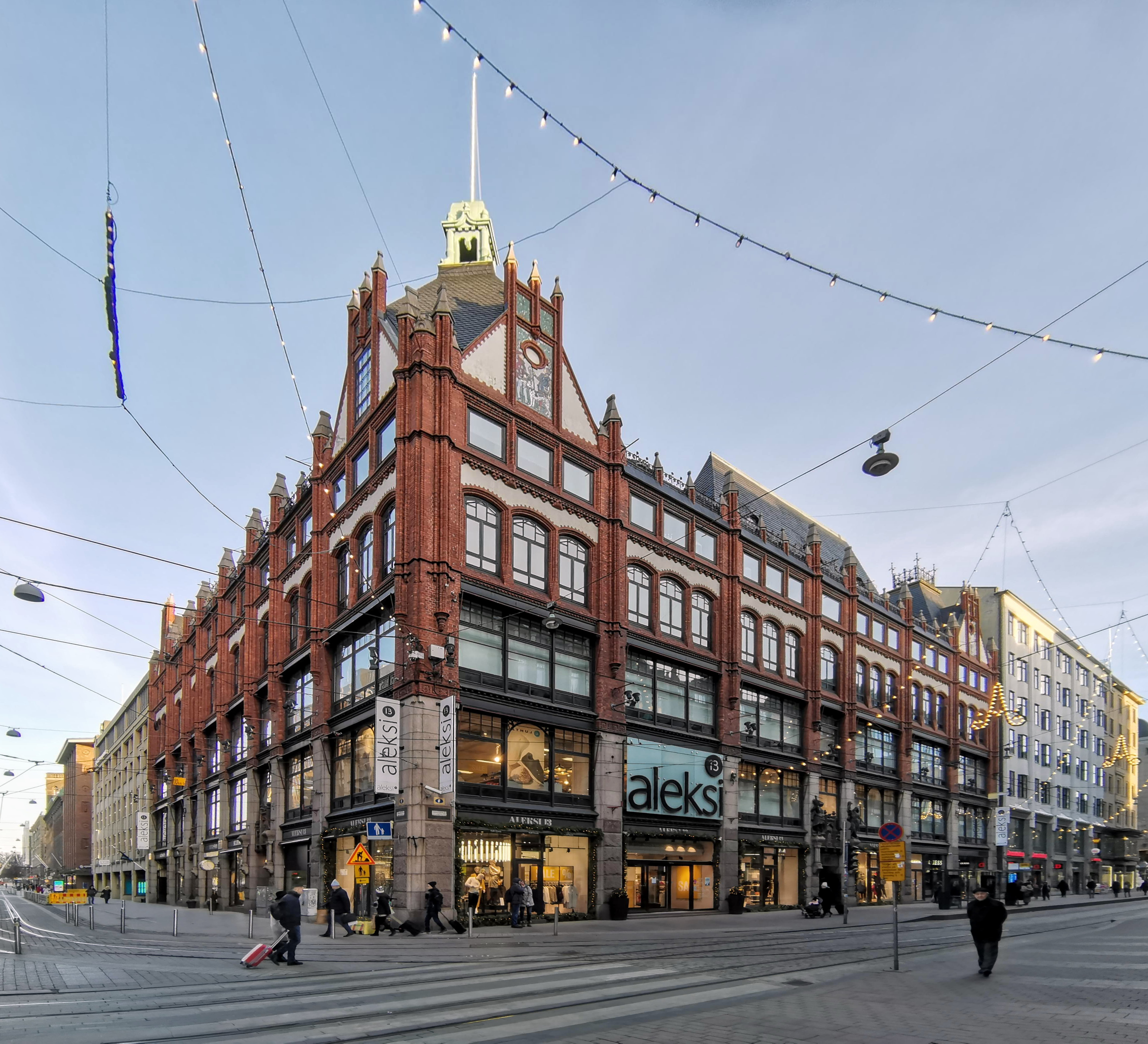
- Interactive map of the Lundqvist Building area

General information
- Type: department store
- Architectural style: Gothic Revival, Art Nouveau
- Location: Kluuvi, Helsinki, Finland
- Coordinates: 60°10′09″N 24°56′45″E
- Current tenants: Glasshouse Helsinki
- Construction started: 1898
- Completed: 1900
- Client: J.F. Lundqvist

Technical details
- Structural system: iron, concrete

Design and construction
- Architects: Selim A. Lindqvist, Elia Heikel

The Lundqvist Building is a former department store in the Kluuvi district of central Helsinki, Finland. It is located at the intersection of Aleksanterinkatu and Mikonkatu streets. Until the end of 2020, it housed the Aleksi 13 department store, but is now the home of Glasshouse Helsinki, a boutique for ecologically minded fashion. Its architecture represents a transition from the revivalism of the nineteenth century to Art Nouveau and advanced construction techniques at the dawn of the twentieth.

The Lundqvist building was constructed between 1898 and 1900 to designs of the prominent Helsinki architect Selim A. Lindqvist with the builder Elia Heikel, and replaced a two-story wooden structure. Reputedly Lundqvist received the plot of land free of charge on the condition that he first build a wooden house before constructing a stone building. One might compare the new building with the contemporaneous commercial designs of the Chicago school, such as Louis Sullivan’s Carson, Pirie, Scott store (1899–1904). It was the first such large-scale commercial retail building in Finland.

The design is interesting for its innovations in construction and rather unique façade. Lindqvist and Heikel's structural solution used an iron point-support system of pillars on the interior to maximize the openness and flexibility of the space, a key feature for department stores, which often need to change the configuration of floor displays. Meanwhile, the façades, which are nonetheless unusually still load-bearing and also provide support for the interior stairwells, use a concrete structure, overlaid with the brick and stucco veneer on the exterior. This strategy permits the façade to be opened up with relatively large windows as was the norm for department stores at the end of the nineteenth century to maximize the amount of natural illumination of the products shown inside, which would also then catch the eye of pedestrians on the street. Despite these innovations, advanced techniques for the turn of the century, the building's original iron frame was modified during renovations in 1981, and new windows were added at the attic level.

The building's façade emphasizes verticality with the Gothic-revival articulation of each bay with thin brick colonnettes that terminate in spires, and like many department stores of the period, it is crowned by a corner tower with steep gables with stucco infill, reminiscent of the brick style of the Hanover School popularized in northern Germany by the architect and professor Conrad Wilhelm Hase from the 1860s onwards. This contrasts with contemporary buildings, most notably the Pohjola Insurance building directly across the street, whose heavy stone load-bearing walls and thin windows are more reminiscent of a Richardsonian Romanesque style that speaks to the walls' obvious load-bearing function for the entire structure. The affinity for Gothic is echoed at the entrance bays, which are adorned with tracery-like floral decoration. One of these is flanked by the figural sculptures of Spinning and Hunting, designed by the Finnish artist Robert Stigell. In classical mythology, they arguably represent Athena, the goddess of handicraft, practical skills, the arts, wisdom and livelihood; and Artemis, a huntress and the protector of forests.

== Gallery ==
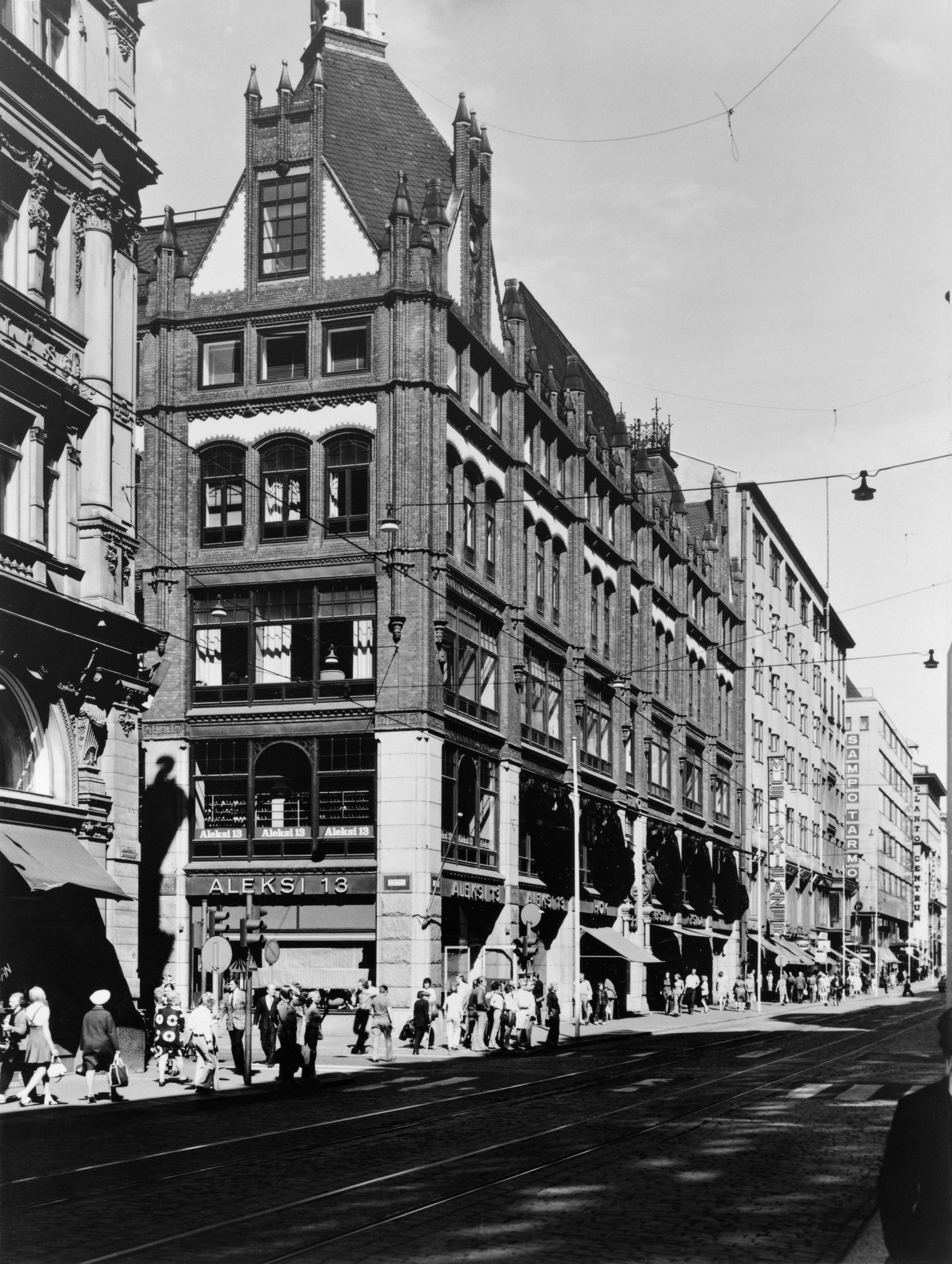
View along Alekserinkatu, 1975.

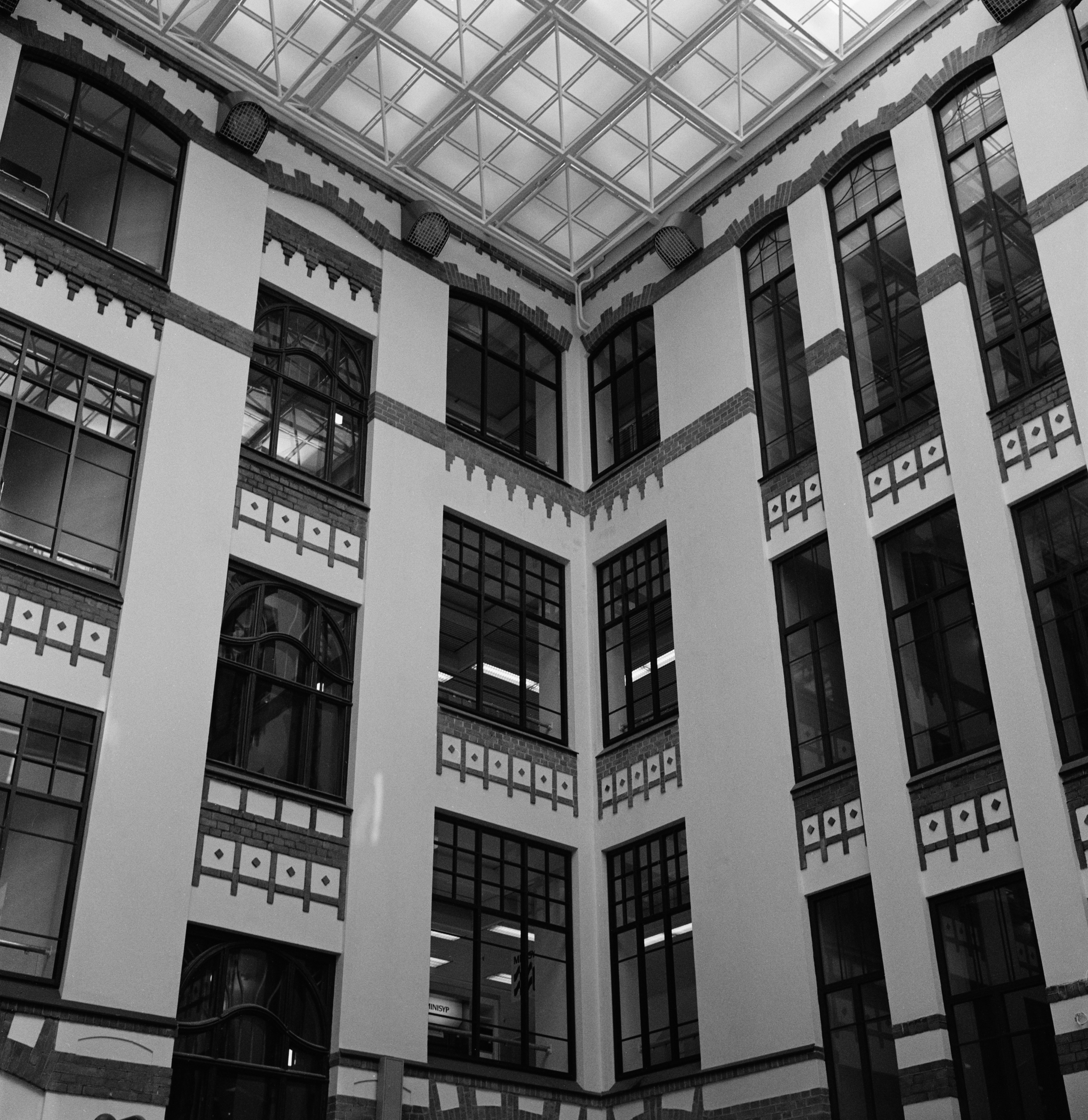
Interior showing brick detail

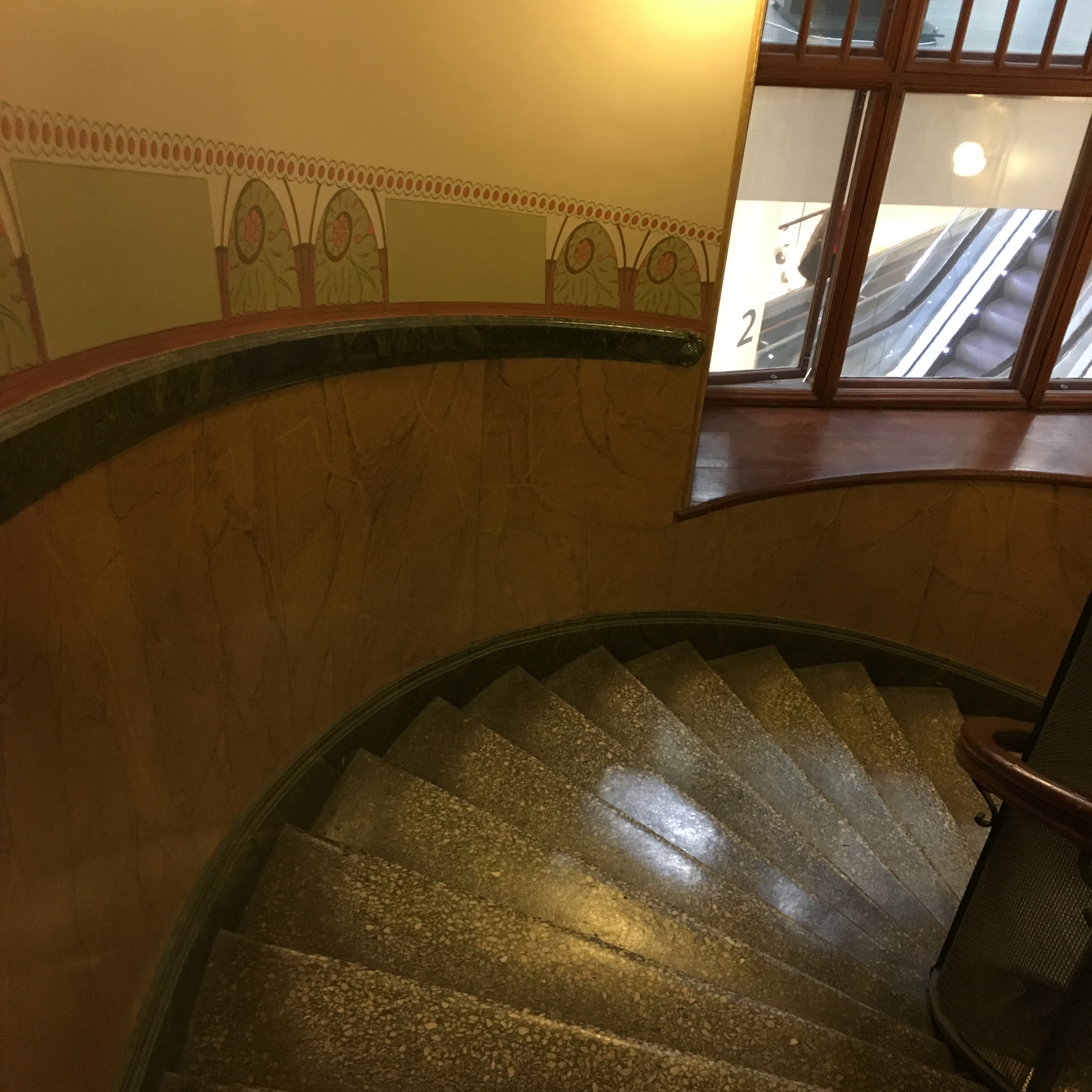
Detail of interior staircase

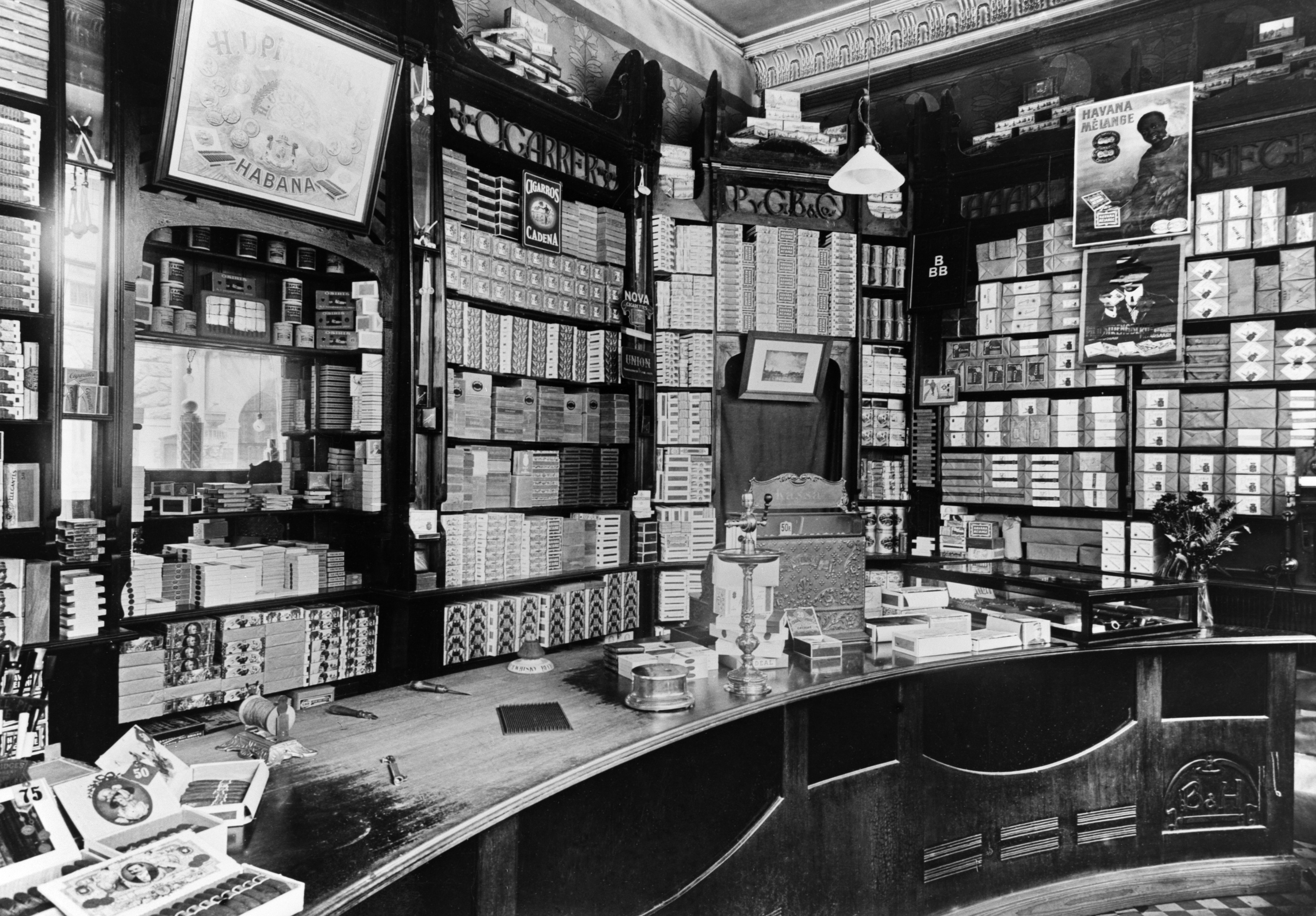
Holland Cigar Importers outlet inside the store, 1917

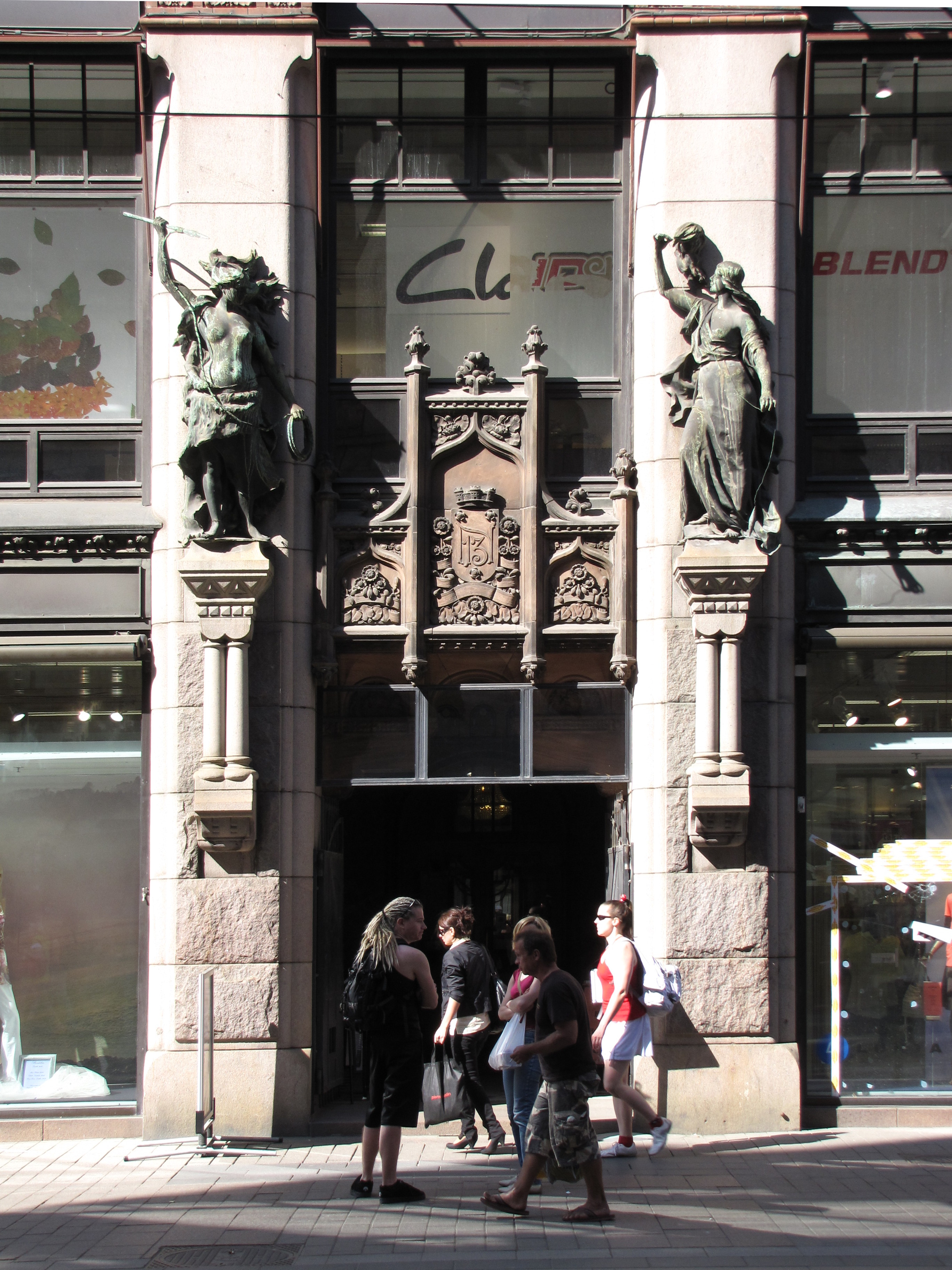
Robert Stigell's sculptures Spinning and Hunting at entrance on Alekserinkatu

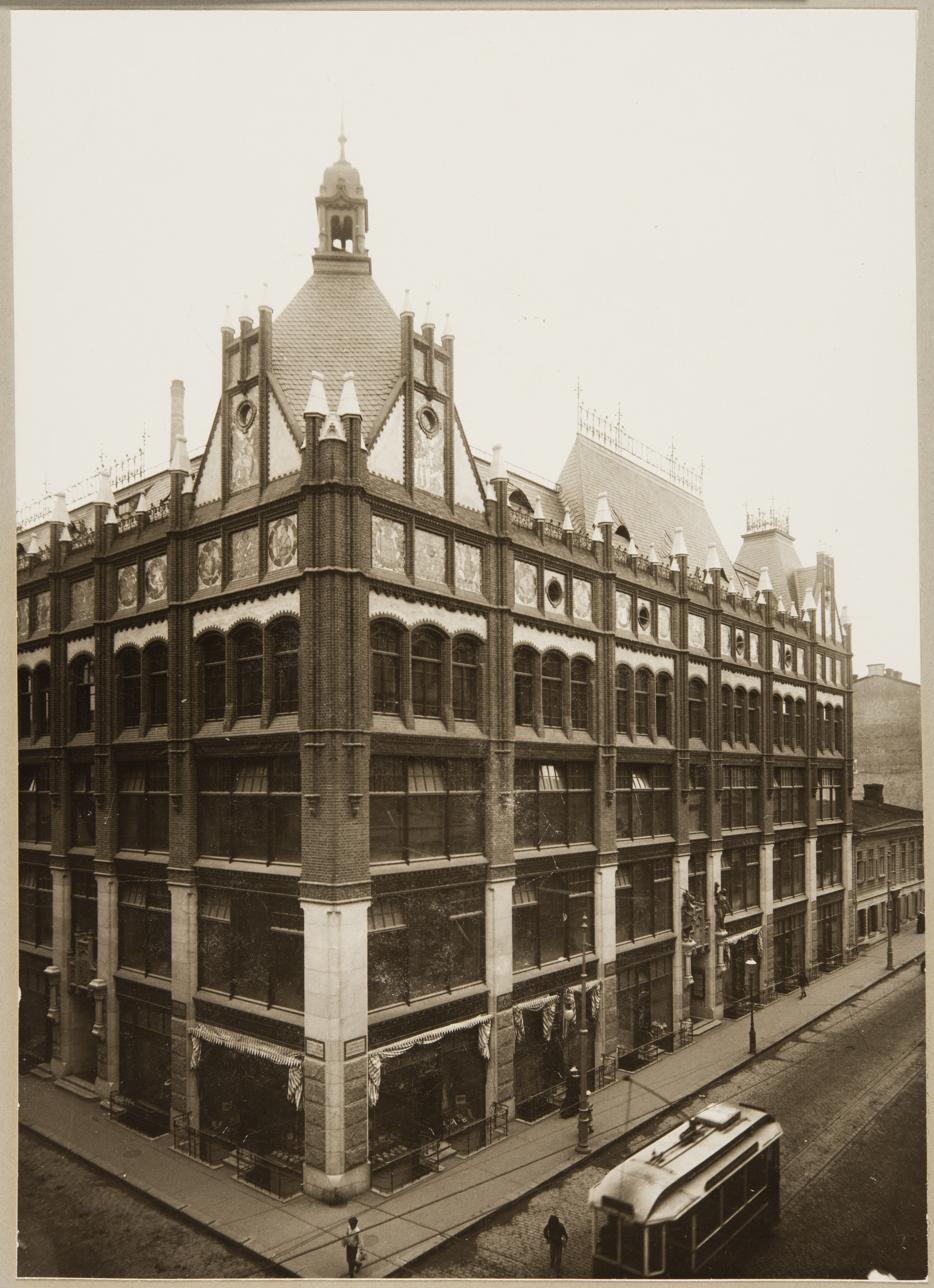
Perspective, circa 1900

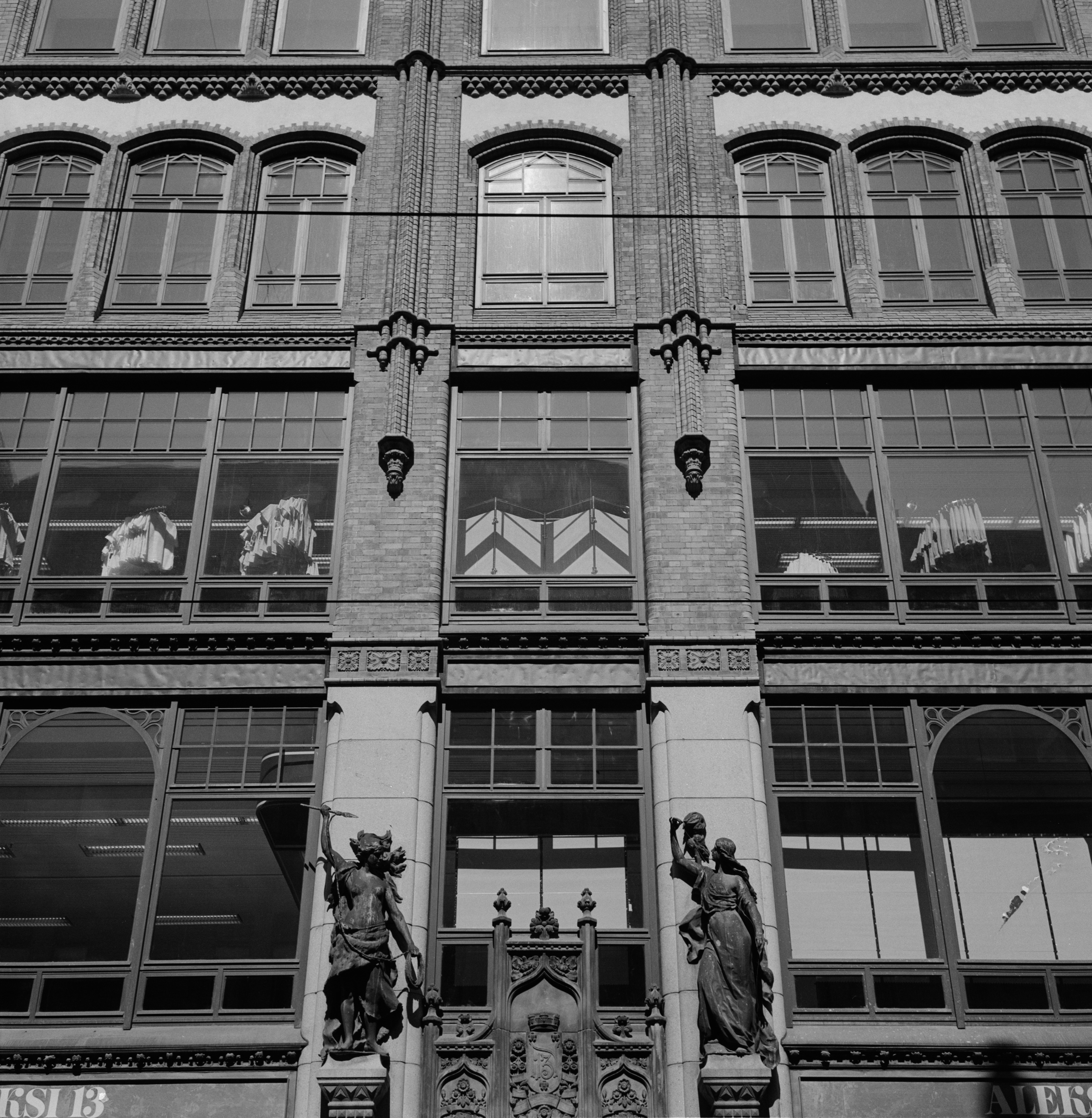
Façade detail, 1981

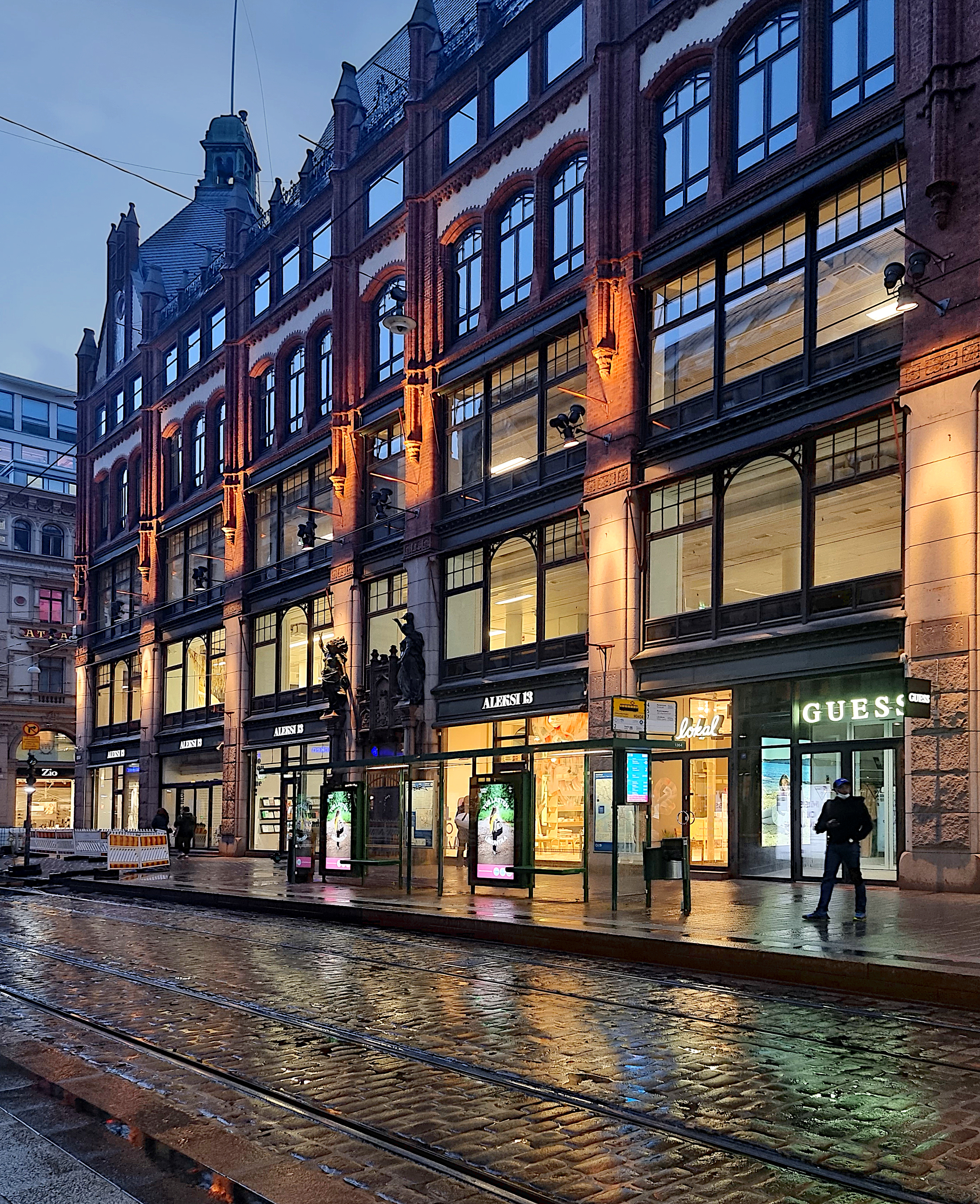
Evening view of Alekserinkatu façade, August 2021
