= Pohjola Insurance building =

Office building in Helsinki, Finland

Coordinates: 60°10′07.5″N 24°56′44.9″E

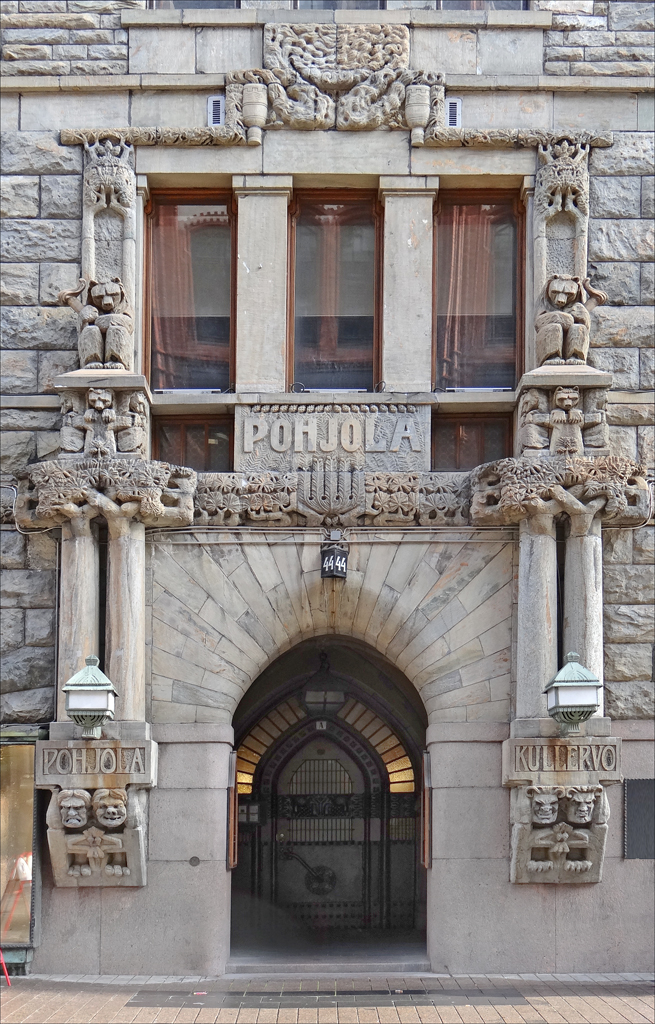
Main entrance of the Pohjola Insurance building; sculptures by Hilda Flodin

The Pohjola Insurance building is the former headquarters of the Pohjola Insurance Company at Aleksanterinkatu 44 and Mikonkatu 3 in central Helsinki. Primarily designed by Gesellius, Lindgren & Saarinen and constructed in 1899–1901, it is a prominent example of Finnish national romantic architecture. It was acquired in 1972 by Kansallis-Osake-Pankki, now succeeded by Nordea.

== Background ==
The Pohjola Insurance Company (precursor of OP Financial Group) was founded in 1891 and specialised in fire insurance. They held a competition for the design of their headquarters, which would also house another Fennomane insurance company, Kullervo, with the specification that the building must be of fire-resistant stone. Based on the submissions, they commissioned Gesellius, Lindgren & Saarinen to design the exteriors and major interior spaces, but Ines and Ernst A. Törnvall were responsible for the plans. It was the first commercial building by Gesellius, Lindgren & Saarinen.

== Building ==
The building is national romantic in style, with façades of rough-hewn soapstone, red granite and serpentine decorated with sculptures of vegetation, squirrels, and figures from Kalevala, and on the street corner a tower with a pinecone-shaped roof. When it was built, a reviewer dwelt on its "Finnish-naturalistic" style, but in form the exterior may have been influenced by contemporary American buildings: Henry Hobson Richardson's Cheney Building similarly uses a corner tower, and the use of windows resembles that in Louis Sullivan's Auditorium Building. Another Finnish architect, Bertel Jung, criticised the romantic elements as embodying "primitive, partially crude and untamed force". Other reviewers praised it for its comparability to buildings in other countries and to their use of ornament.

Lindgren, the member of the firm who appears to have been most attached to national romanticism, greatly influenced the ornamentation of this building. The main entrance, designed by Hilda Flodin, a pupil of Rodin, is flanked by the names of the two insurance companies, both from Kalevala, and by devils, monsters or trolls; bears, the symbol of the insurance company, top the pilasters and also appear in the interior decoration. Because the mouths of the Pohjola characters are slightly open, passers-by sometimes leave cigarette butts in their mouths as a prank.

The door itself is deeply recessed under an arch, and the vestibule continues the allusion to medieval architecture, with vaulting and with carved animals topping pillars. The rest of the interior also used rustic and folklore motifs, with doorways by Erik O. W. Ehrström, iron wheel chandeliers by G. W. Sohlberg, and a circular main stairway with a cast-iron banister with pine-tree motifs; the newel posts and the benches on the landings were carved wood depicting fern leaves and, again, trolls, and the stained glass featured ferns and owls. The service hall on the first floor was given red pine panelling and a central pillar styled to resemble a tree trunk. However, it has a steel core; behind the façades the building is brick with structural steel and from the start had Swedish-made lifts as well as an electrical generator. The structural engineer was Elia Heikel, who was also working at the time on the Lundqvist Building opposite, which is seen as the first modern commercial building in Finland.

== Uses ==
The building originally had flats on the upper three floors. It was acquired in 1972 by Kansallis-Osake-Pankki, a bank which has subsequently been merged to form Nordea, but until 1987 Pohjola Insurance still had some customer service operations in the building. The customer service hall has since then been used as banqueting space. The tobacconist's Havanna-Aitta has been in the ground-floor commercial space for decades.

== Gallery ==
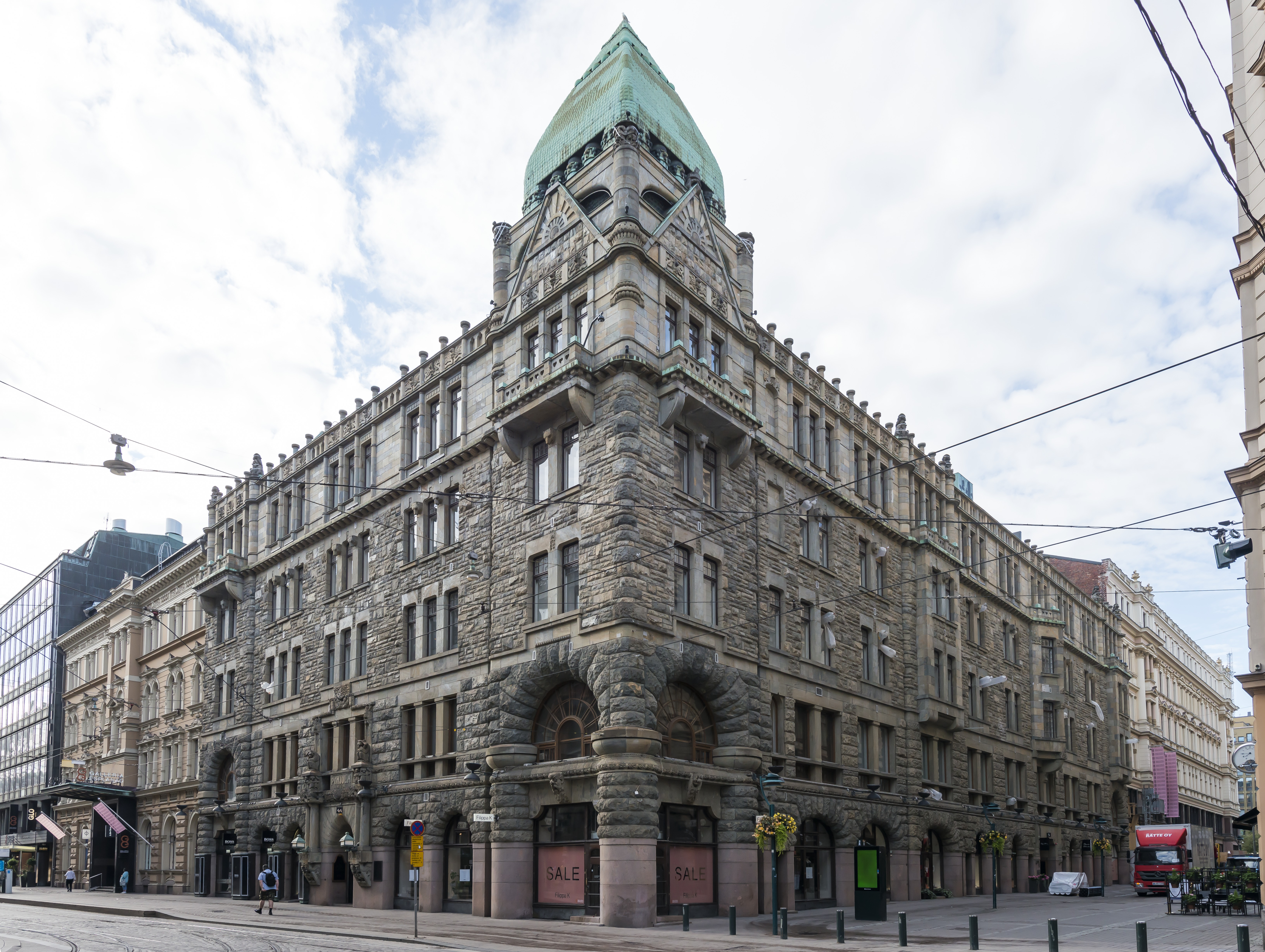
Entire building pictured from the corner

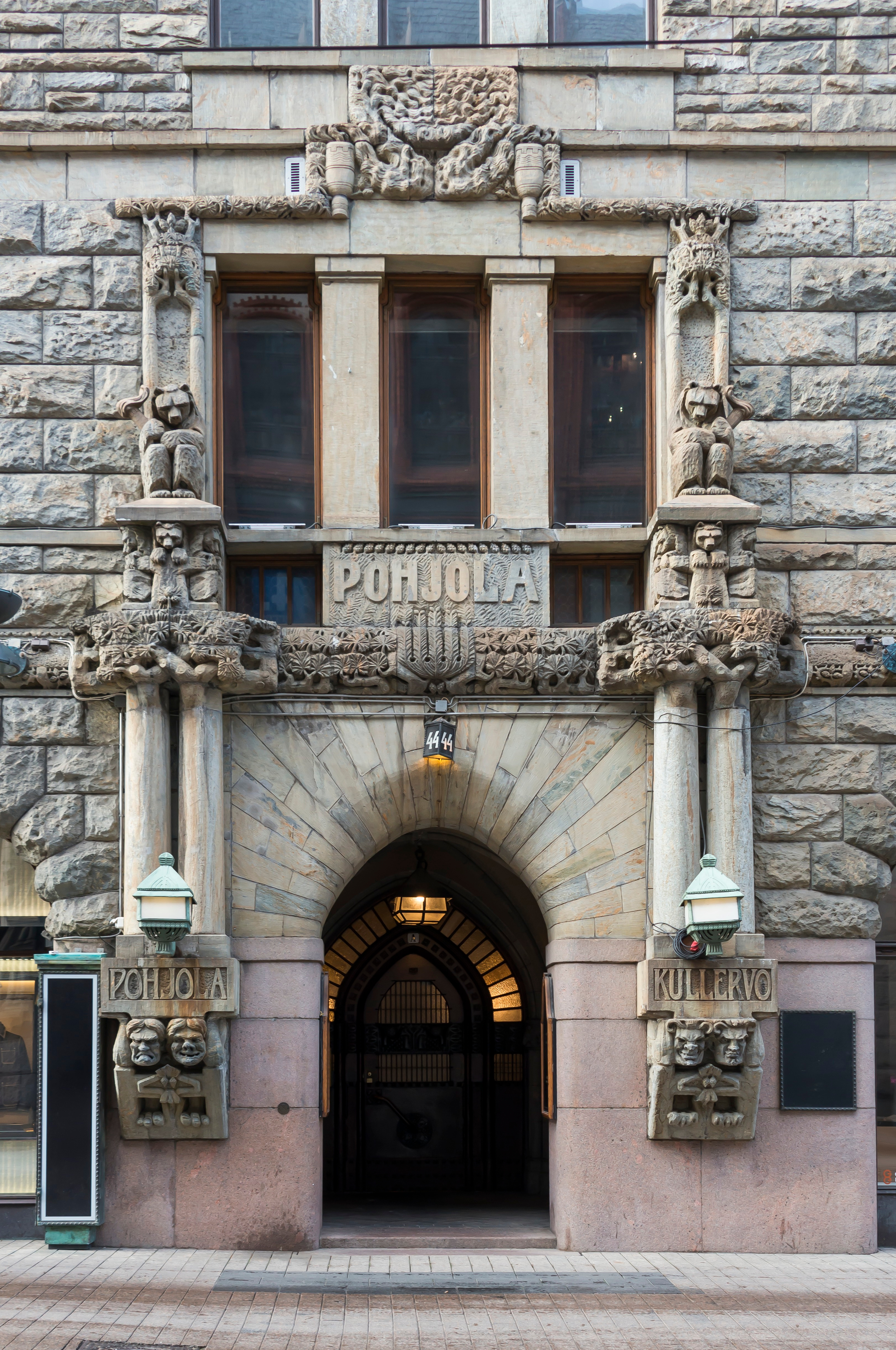
Front door sculptures in detail

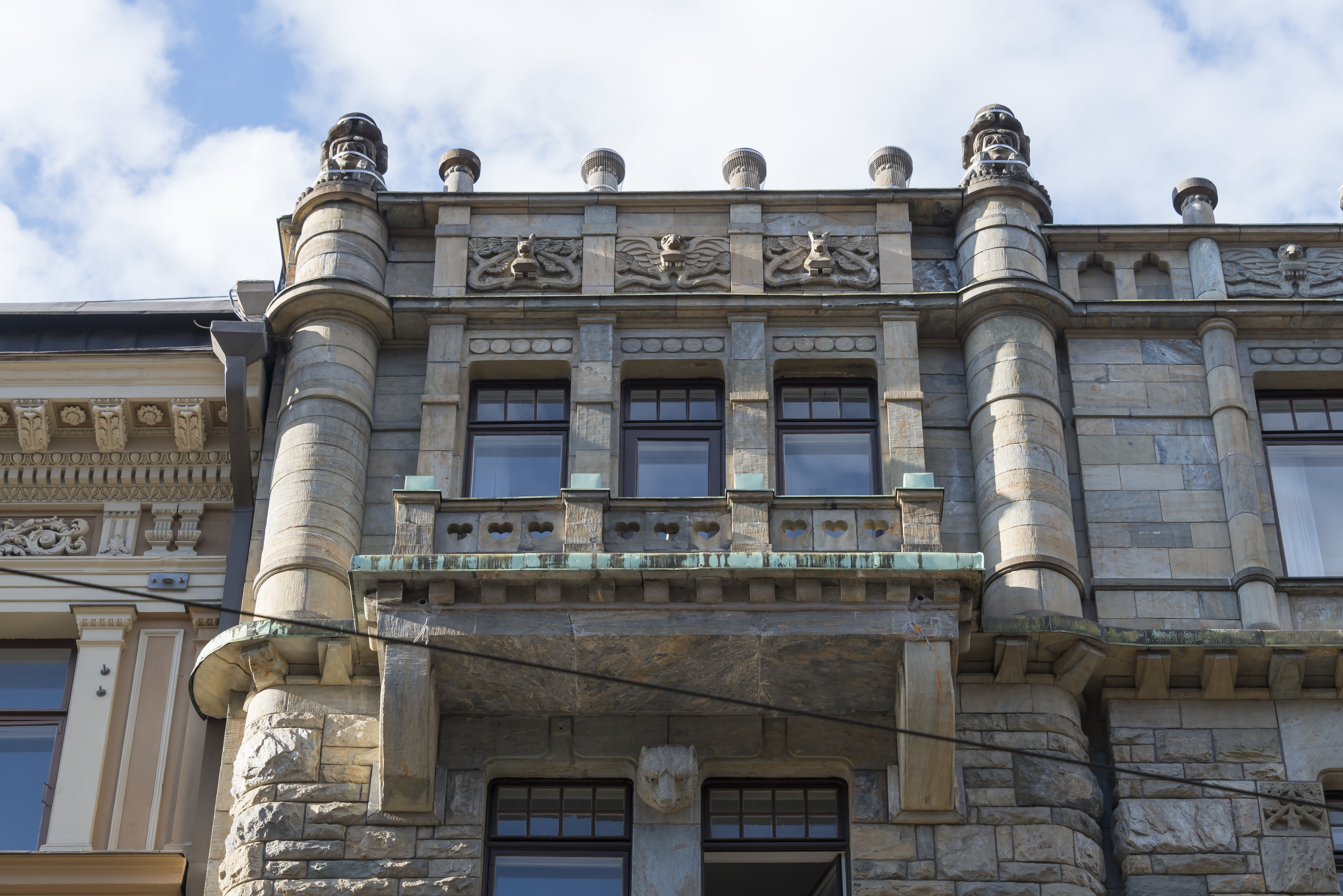
Balcony

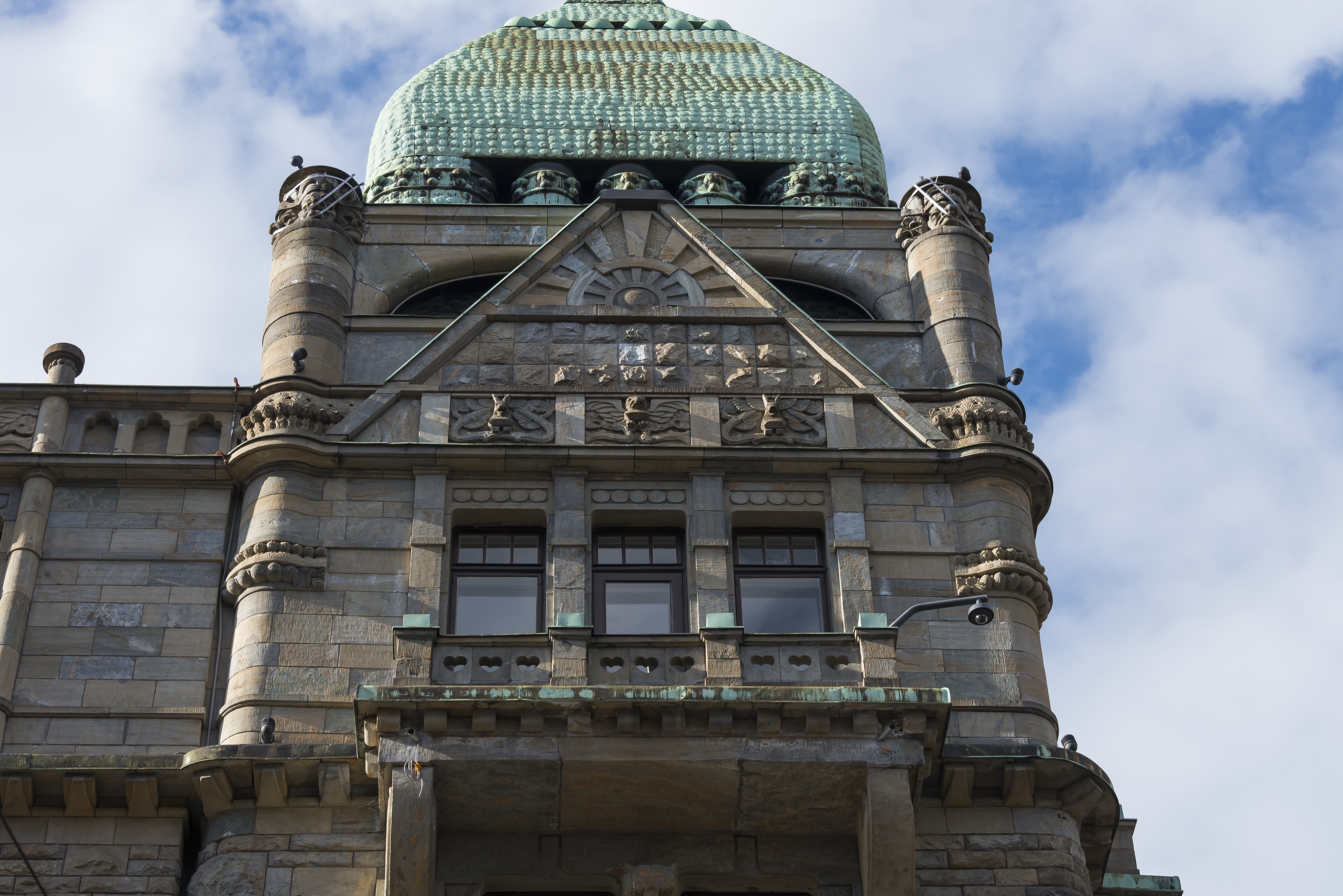
Tower

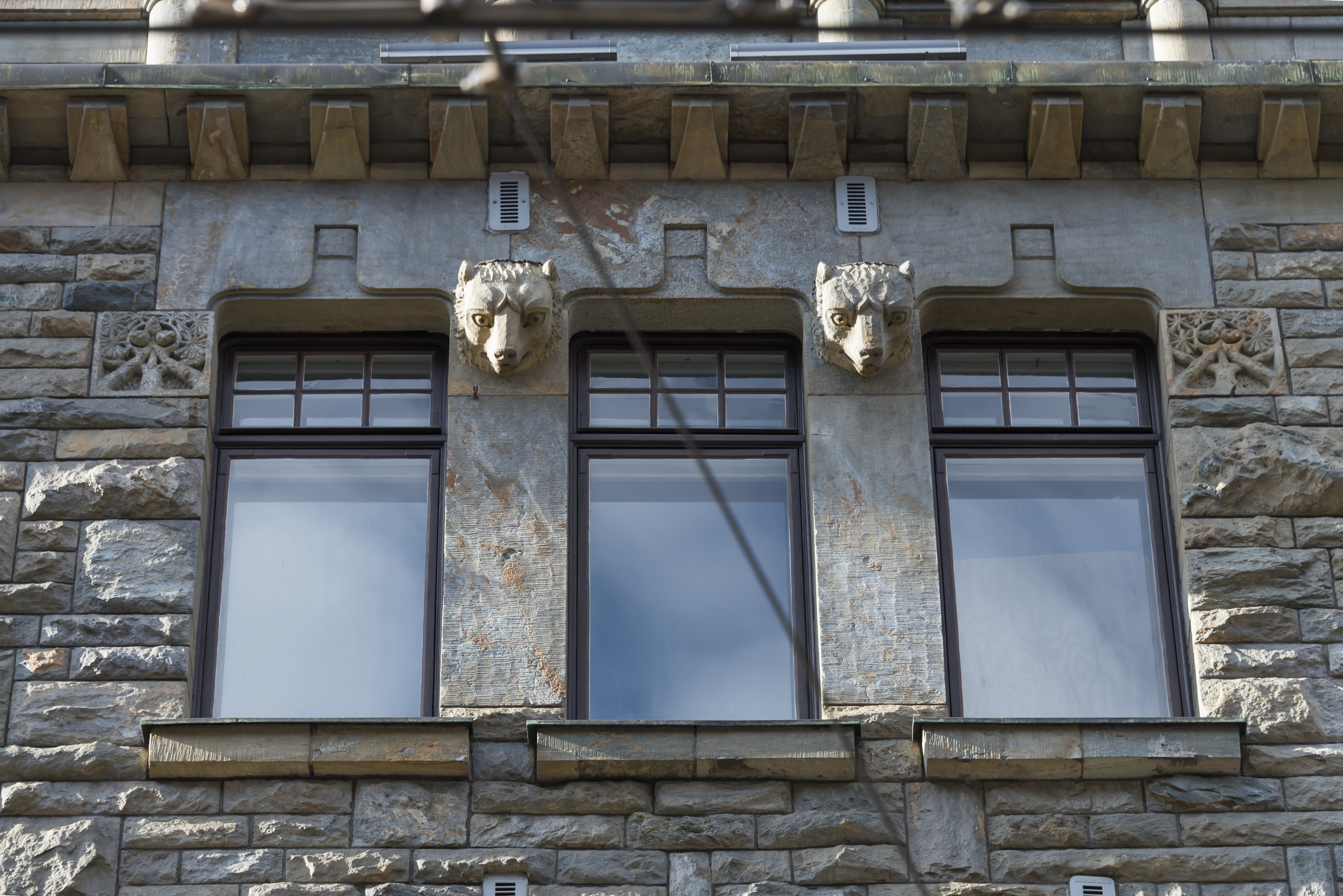
Sculpture detail

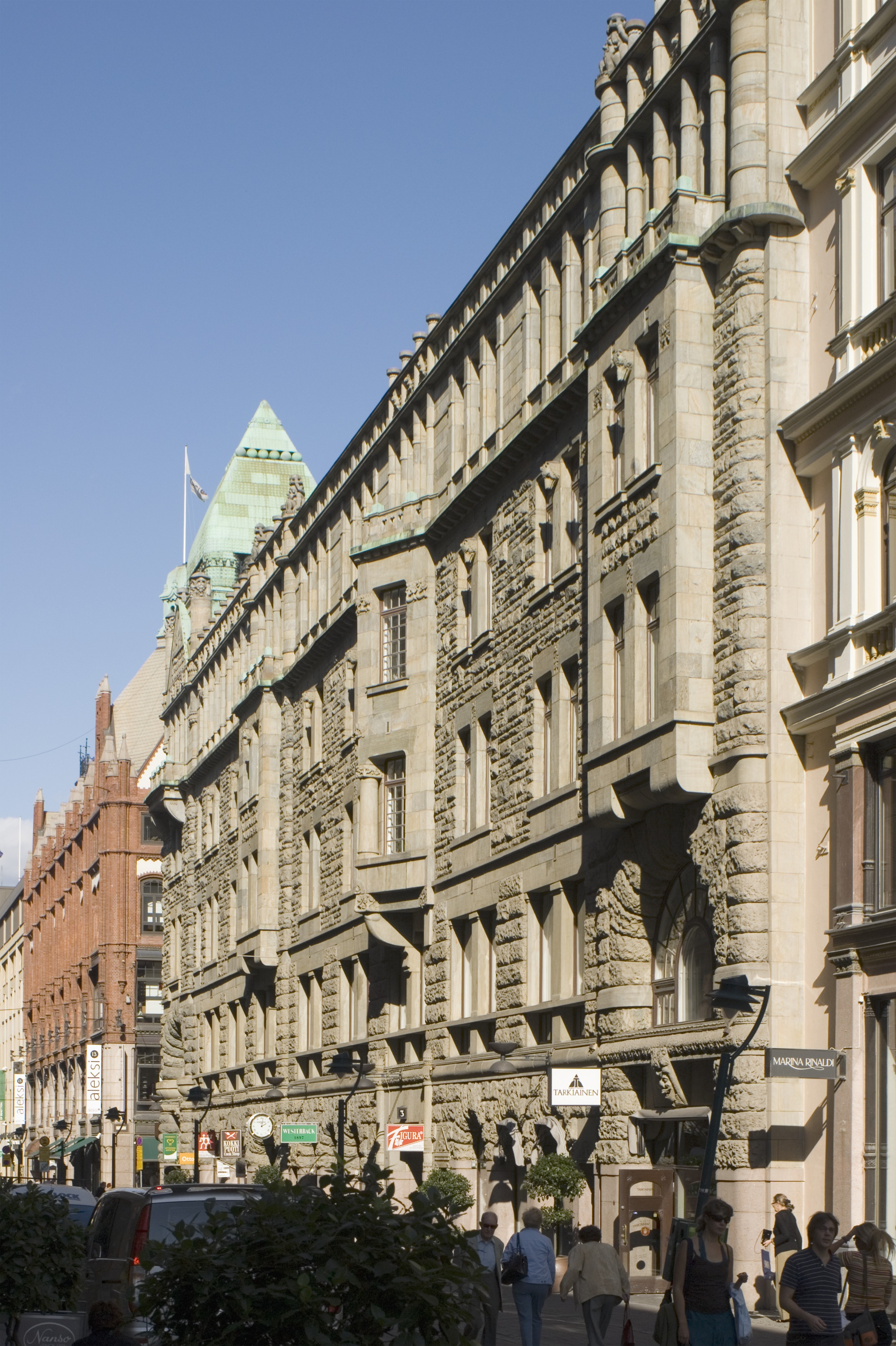
Western side from the south

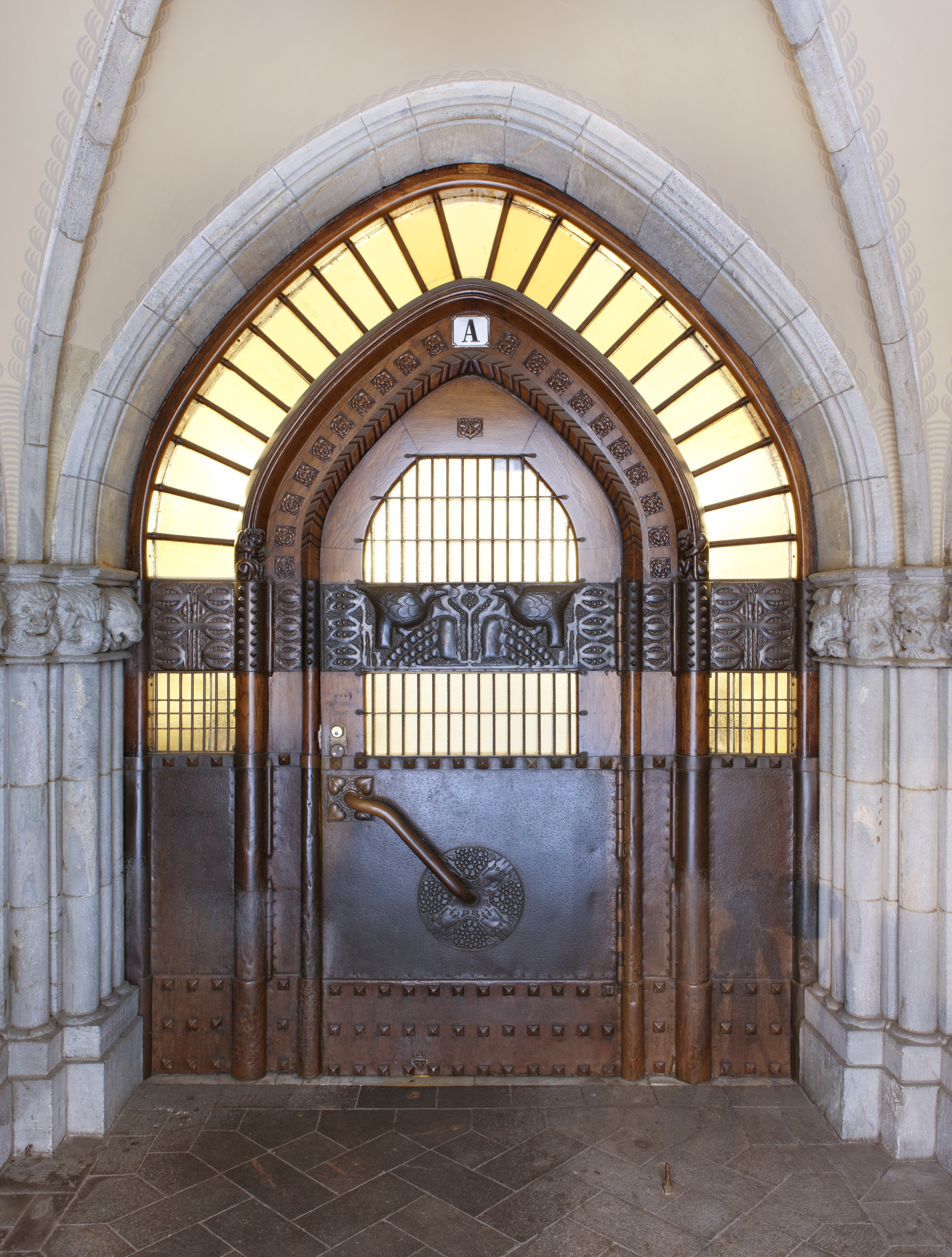
Copper front door by Eric O. W. Ehrström

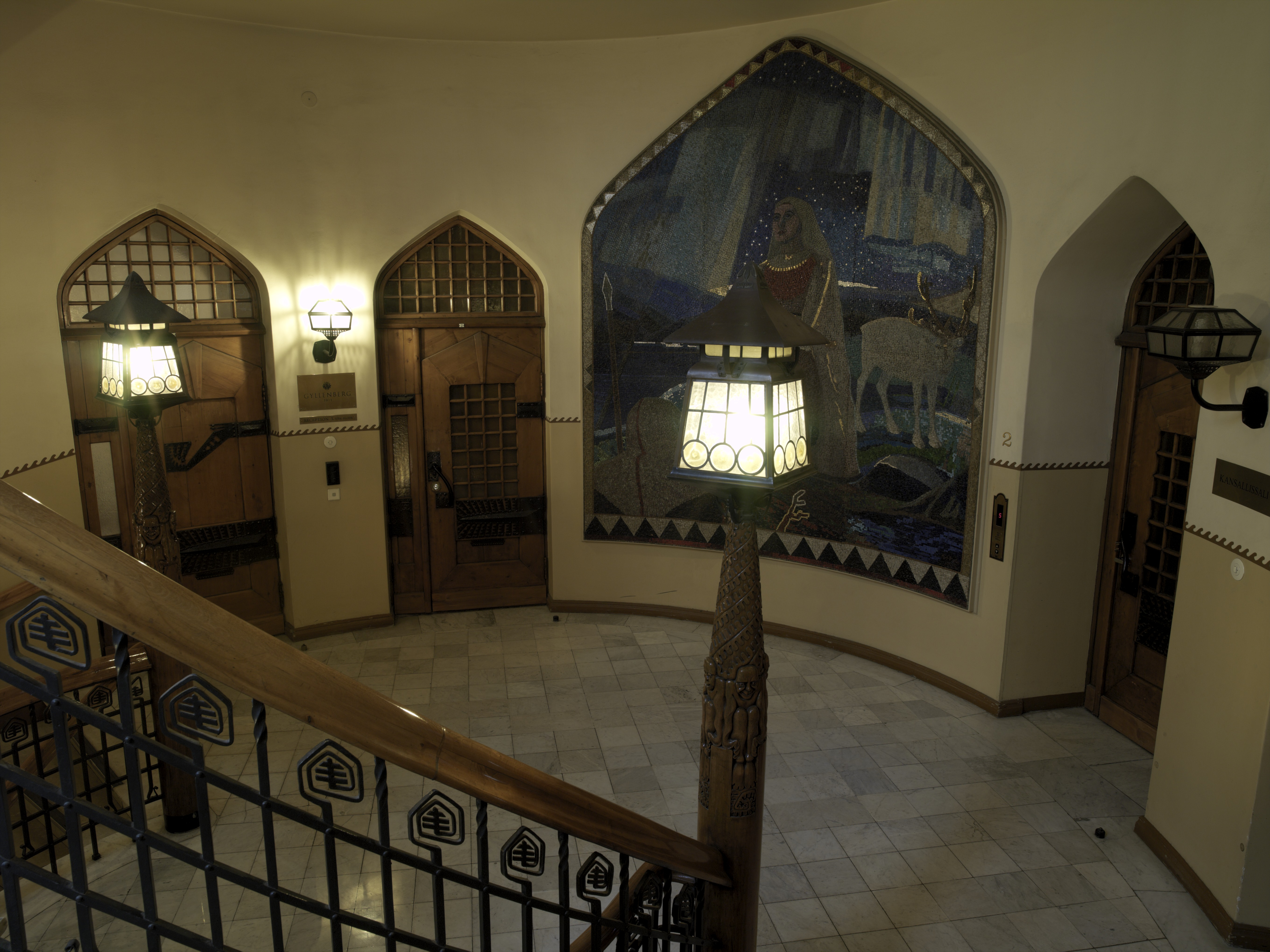
Second floor interior, metalwork by Gabriel Wilhelm Sohlberg
