= Kaivokatu =

Street in Helsinki, Finland

Coordinates: 60.1704°N 24.9415°E

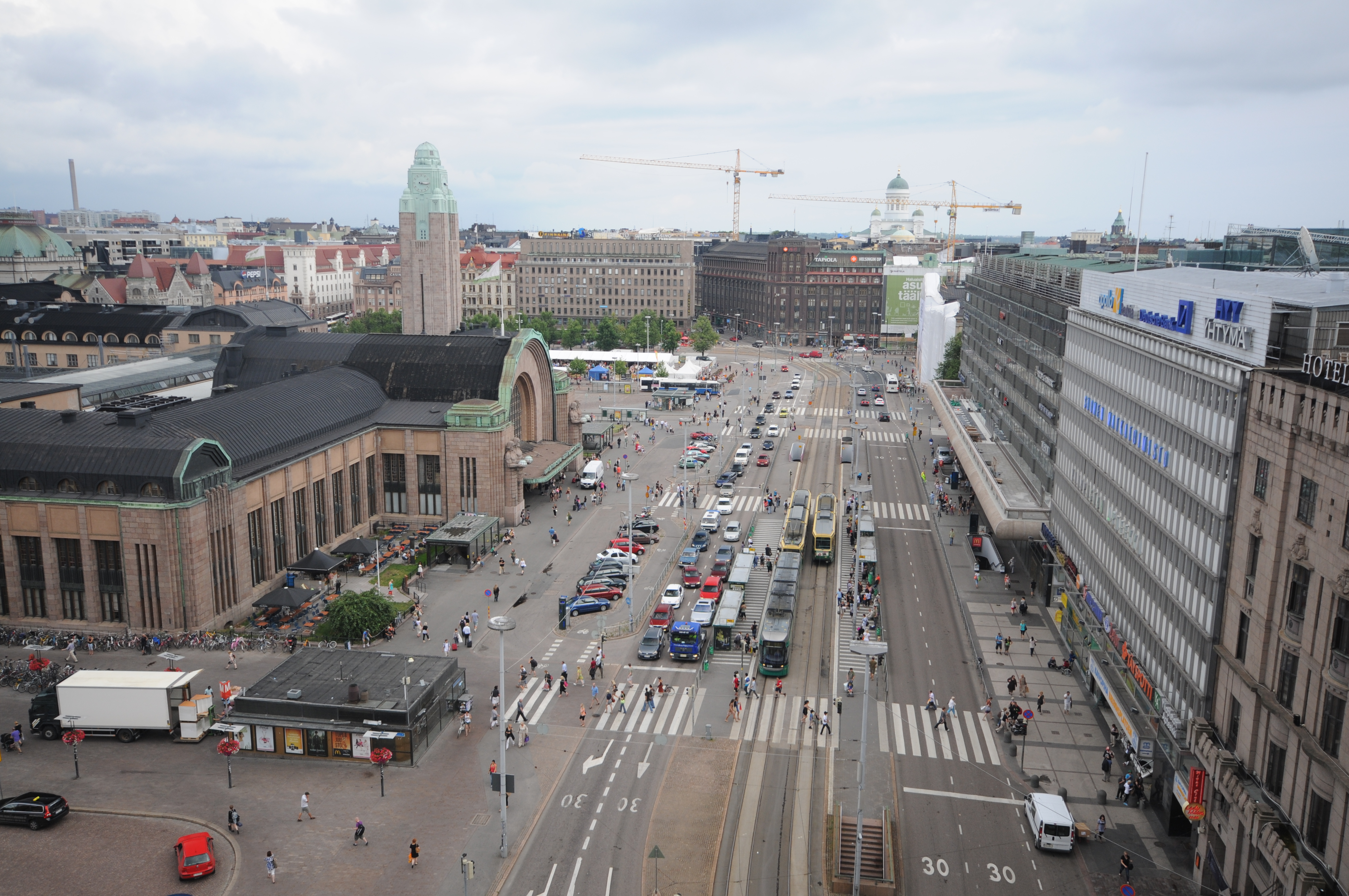
Kaivokatu seen (in 2011) from the west, with the Central Station on the left

Kaivokatu (Swedish: Brunnsgatan) is a short street in central Helsinki, Finland. It runs past the Central Station and station square, connecting Mannerheimintie in the west with Mikonkatu in the east (after which the road continues as Kaisaniemenkatu). Towards its eastern end is located the Ateneum art museum of the Finnish National Gallery.

Kaivokatu carries heavy road traffic, forming the link between the main thoroughfares in and out of the city, eastbound via Hämeentie and westbound via Mannerheimintie, as well as several tram and bus routes. To reduce its traffic load, the City Council decided in 2023 to comprehensively rebuild the Kaivokatu area in 2026–2027, as part of which the street will be closed to private cars and remain open to only public transport, bicycles and pedestrians, a controversial plan which received plenty of attention and vocal resistance as well as support.

The street gets its name, which literally means "well street" from the 19th-century Kluuvi well (Globrunnen), located on what is now the corner of Kaivokatu and Keskuskatu. The name in Finnish was first attested in 1866, and made official in 1909.

Underneath the western end of Kaivokatu is the underground shopping centre Asematunneli, and below that, the Central Railway Station metro station of the Helsinki Metro.
