= Hilda Flodin =

Finnish painter, sculptor, and visual artist (1877–1958)

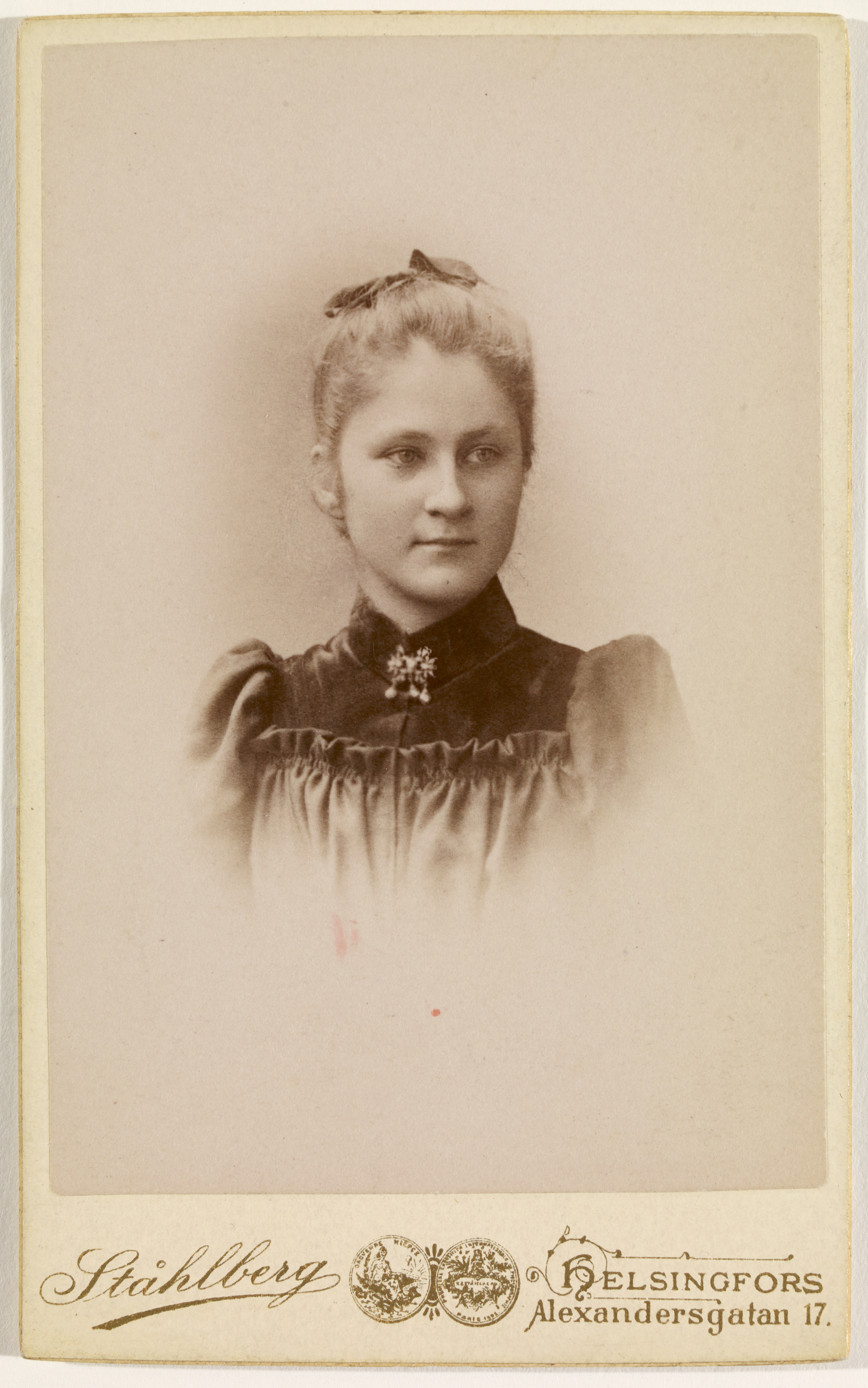
- Photograph of the Finnish artist Hilda Flodin
- Born: 16 March 1877
- Died: 9 March 1958 (aged 80)

Hilda Flodin (16 March 1877 – 9 March 1958) was a Finnish artist. She worked in a variety of media, but in the first part of her career primarily sculpture and etchings, later primarily painting, especially portraits.

== Life and career ==
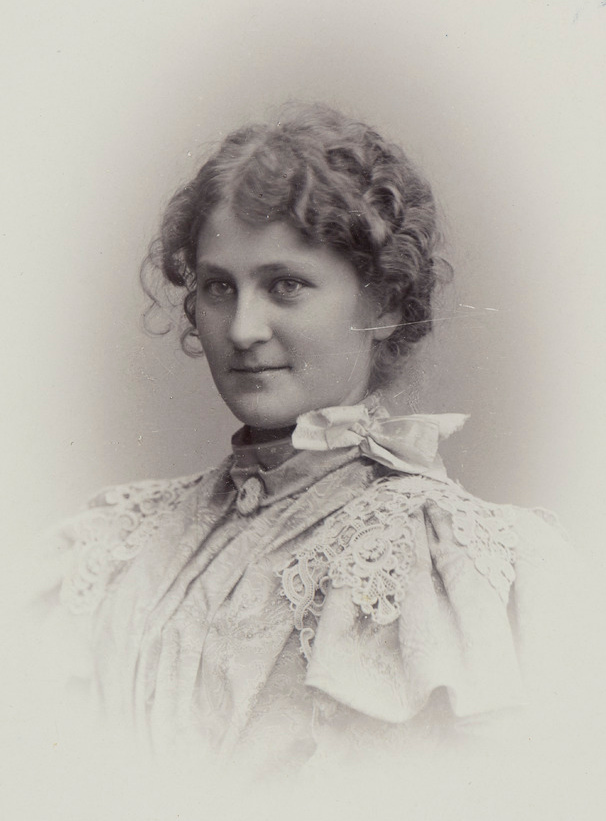
Photograph of Hilda Flodin by Daniel Nyblin

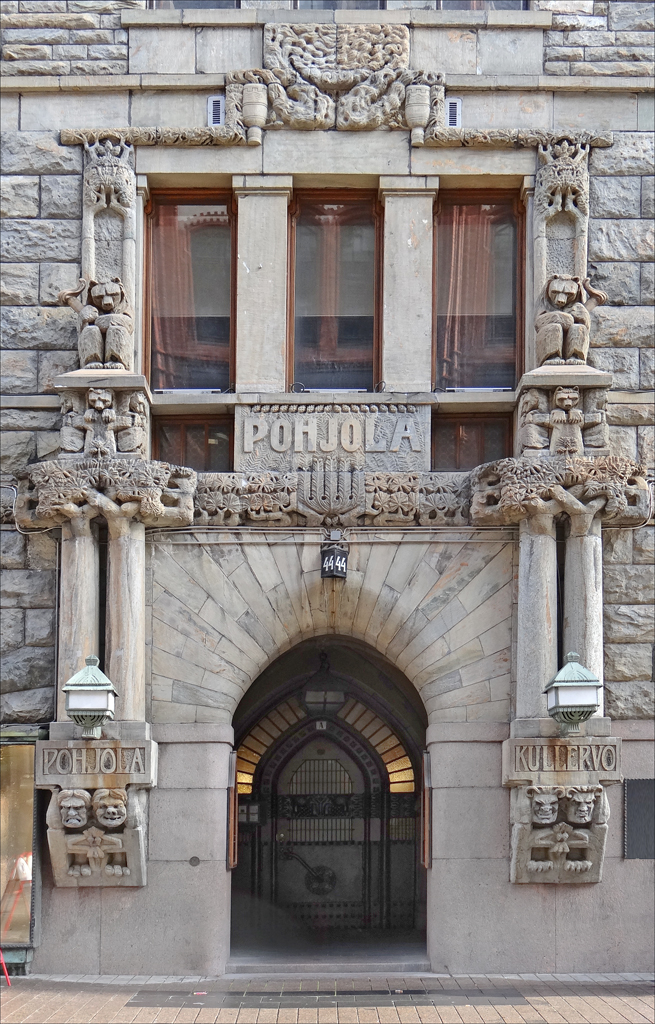
Main entrance of the Pohjola Insurance building; sculptures by Hilda Flodin

Flodin was born in Helsinki into a family with musical and artistic interests. Her mother was the sister of Ida Basilier-Magelssen. She came from a family of 9 and one of her sisters, Fanny, became a pianist. The composer Karl Flodin was her cousin. She began her art studies in 1893 when she was 16 at the Drawing School of the Finnish Art Society in Helsinki, now the Academy of Fine Arts, where her teachers included Albert Gebhard, Elin Danielson and Maria Wiik, and in sculpture Johan Friedl and Carl Eneas Sjöstrand, but in later life she particularly recalled Helene Schjerfbeck. She won an award at the end of her first year in 1897, placing third in the Society's annual prize contest for young artists, and in 1903 she took second place.

After completing her studies in Helsinki in 1898, Flodin studied in Italy and beginning in 1899 in Paris, where she lived with her sister Fanny, who was married to a Frenchman, and attended the Académie Colarossi. In 1903–06 she studied with and assisted Auguste Rodin.

Early in her career, Flodin was known primarily for her sculptures. These included a marble bust of Robert Kajanus and a bronze, Old Man Thinking, in the Ateneum in Helsinki, as well as the folklore-inspired carvings surrounding the main entrance of Gesellius, Lindgren & Saarinen's 1901 Pohjola Insurance building. She was also one of the first Finnish etchers. Albert Edelfelt called her Finland's best etcher; in 1902 Louis Sparre wrote of her etchings that she "[gave] promise of very considerable talent" and "some of her work recalls that of the best masters of the past." Her work is displayed at the first Salon d'automne of Paris in 1903 puis en 1905, 1913 and 1927.

She returned to Finland in 1906 and her relationship with Rodin fades. In 1907, she was the only woman artist participating in the first joint exhibition of graphic arts there; Akseli Gallen-Kallela and Hugo Simberg were among the other exhibitors. In 1910 she moved to Viipuri with her husband, the painter Juho Rissanen; they put together a joint exhibition that year which later travelled to Turku and Helsinki: he showed 60 paintings, while she showed 80 works, including sculptures, etchings and illustrations. She did not begin painting until 1908, but from the 1910s this was her primary focus, especially portraits; many of her drawings and paintings are of children and older women, but she also painted a number of group portraits, including the members of the Executive Board of the Finnish Academy of Sciences (1929–30). Between 1899 and 1930 she showed work in many of the exhibitions of Finnish art.

== Personal life ==
Rodin habitually used his female students as models and sexual partners including Flodin. Flodin and Gwen John, another of his students, models and lovers, were also erotically involved, according to John's letters.

From 1908 to 1914 Flodin was married to the painter Juho Rissanen. Her second marriage was to Taavetti Laitinen, a physician.

She died in Helsinki in 1958.

== Collections and exhibitions ==
Flodin's works are in the Ateneum in Helsinki and in the Keuruu Museum, which has an exhibit built around a portfolio discovered in a Helsinki antiquarian bookshop. A 2016 exhibition of Rodin works in Helsinki included works by Flodin and by Sigrid af Forselles, another female Finnish sculptor who studied with him in the 1880s.

== See also ==
- Golden Age of Finnish Art
