= Yliopistonkatu (Helsinki) =

Street in Helsinki, Finland

Coordinates: 60°10.19′N 24°56.91′E

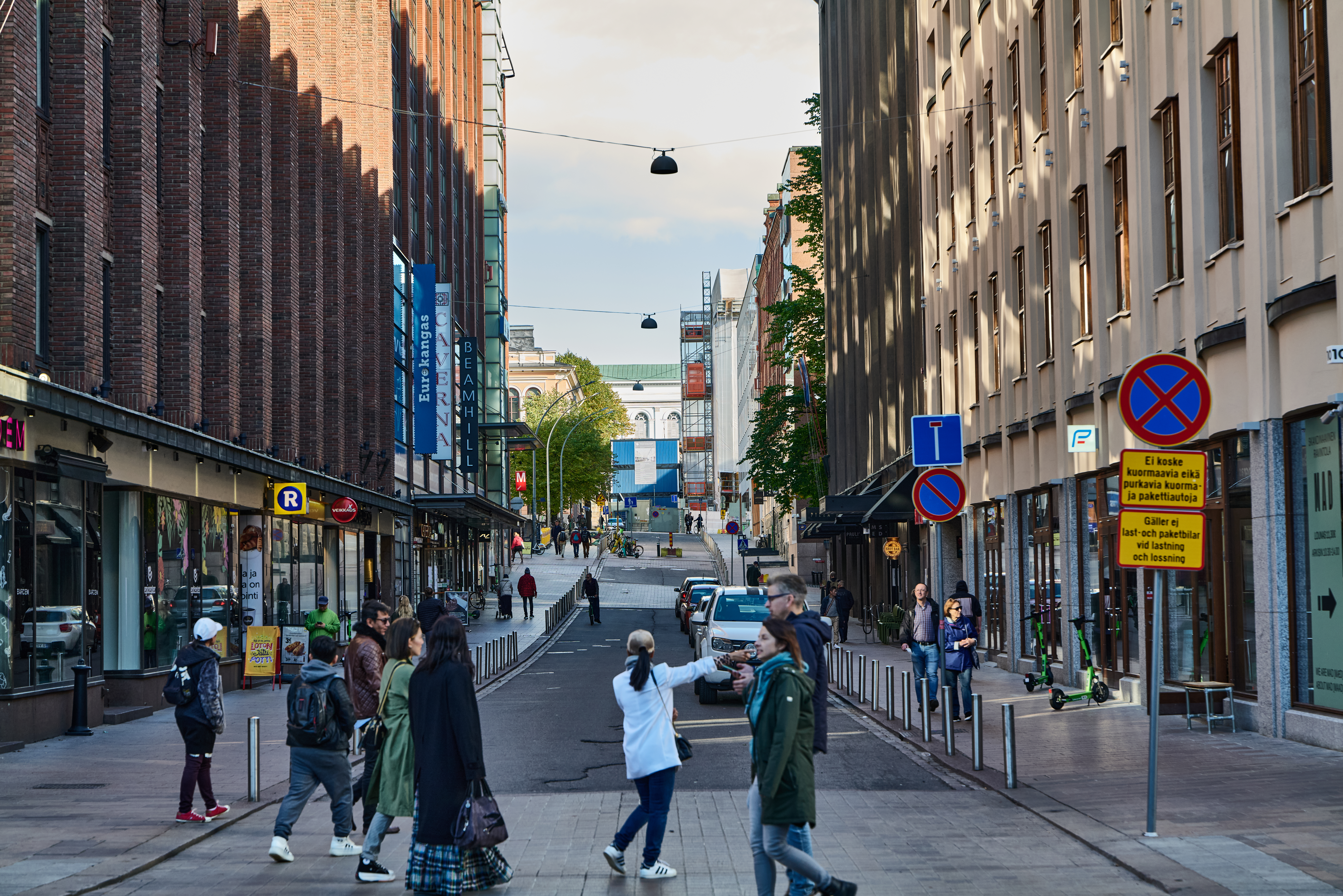
A view of the end of Yliopistonkatu at Mikonkatu viewed to the east.

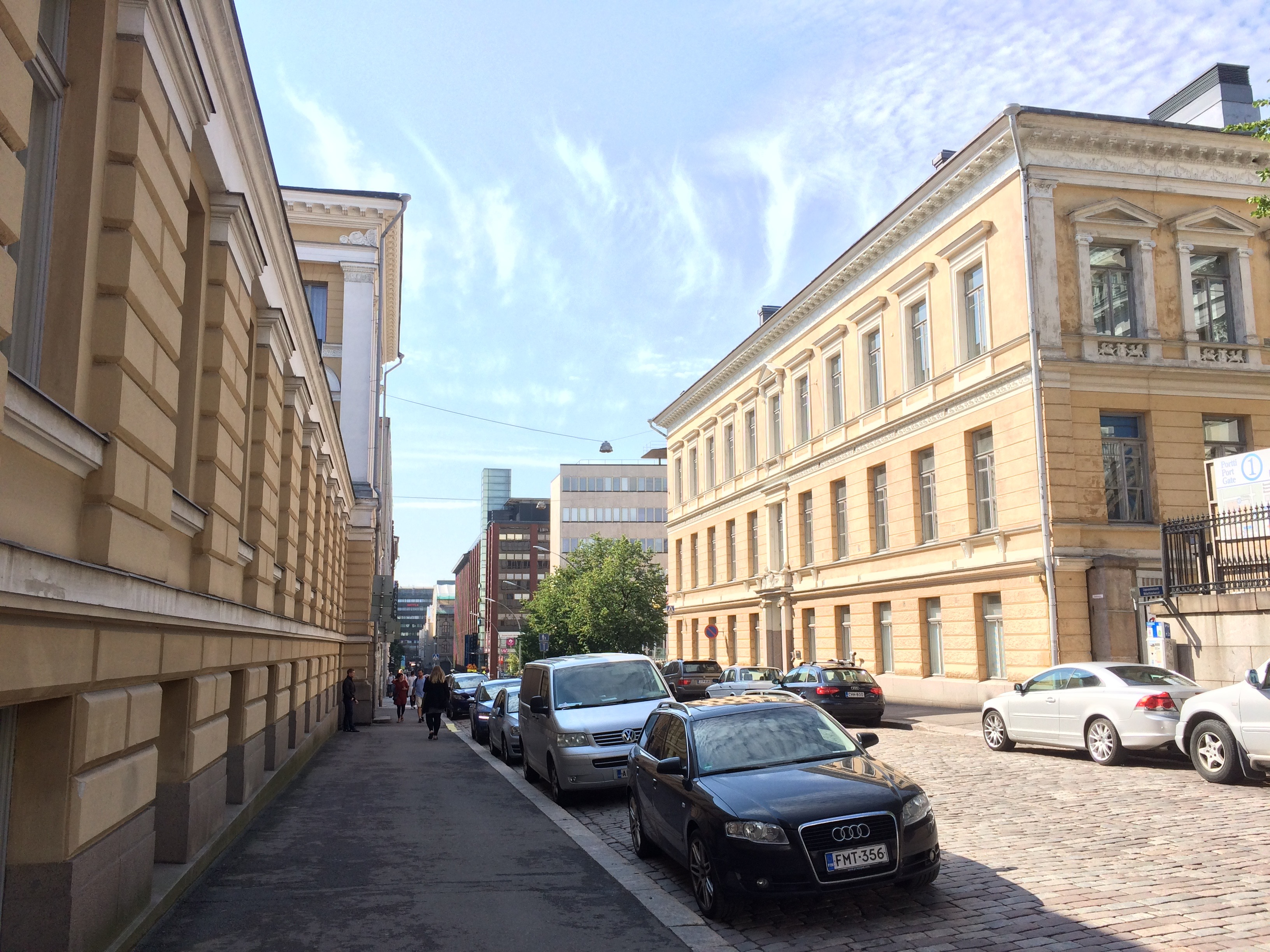
A view of the end of Yliopistonkatu at Unioninkatu to the west.

Yliopistonkatu (Swedish: Universitetsgatan, both meaning "University Street") is a street in the Kluuvi district of Helsinki, Finland leading east to west. It runs from Unioninkatu at the corner of the Senate Square to Mikonkatu. It was formerly part of Hallituskatu, which at the time led from Mariankatu to Mikonkatu and made a small turn at the Senate Square. The part of Hallituskatu west of Unioninkatu was renamed as Yliopistonkatu in 1995.

There are many buildings of the University of Helsinki along Yliopistonkatu. The eastern part of the street runs between the main building of the university and the National Library of Finland, but both only have a side door leading to the street. At the middle of the street are Porthania and the administrative building of the university located opposite each other. At the corner of Vuorikatu was the Heimola house, which was dismantled in the late 1960. The Parliament of Finland assembled there before the current Parliament House was built.

The part of Yliopistonkatu at Porthania is a pedestrian street.

Yliopistonkatu continues to the west as the slightly narrower pedestrian street Ateneuminkuja running between the Ateneum and Aikatalo buildings from Mikonkatu to Keskuskatu.
