= List of tourist attractions in Helsinki =

This is a list of popular tourism sights in Helsinki, the capital of Finland.

== Architecture ==
Image	Name	Year	Description
	Presidential Palace (Presidentinlinna)	1820	The Presidential Palace is one of the three official residences of the President of Finland. It is situated on the north side of Esplanadi, overlooking the Market Square. The building was originally built, during the era of the Grand Duchy of Finland, to be the official residence in Helsinki of the Tsar of Russia/Grand Duke of Finland, making it an example of Finnish architecture of the Russian Empire.
	Helsinki City Hall (Helsingin kaupungintalo)	1833	The Helsinki City Hall is the central administrative building of the municipality of Helsinki. It is located in the Kruununhaka district, overlooking the Market Square.
	Helsinki Central railway station (Helsingin päärautatieasema)	1919	The Helsinki Central Station (HEC) is the main station for commuter rail and long-distance trains departing from Helsinki, Finland. The Art Deco station building, designed by Eliel Saarinen, represents Finland's architectural shift from the National Romantic style to more modern styles. It is located in the district of Kluuvi.
	Parliament House (Eduskuntatalo)	1931	The Parliament House is the seat of the Parliament of Finland. The stripped classical building, combining neoclassical and modernist architecture, is designed by Johan Sigfrid Sirén. It is located in the district of Töölö, along Mannerheimintie.
	Hotel Torni (Hotelli Torni)	1931	Hotel Torni (Hotel Tower) is a historical tower hotel popular for its panorama bar view overlooking downtown Helsinki. At the time of its completion in 1931, it was among the tallest buildings in Finland.
	Finlandia Hall (Finlandia-talo)	1971	The Finlandia Hall is the premier congress and event venue in Finland. The building is an example of functionalist architecture, designed by Alvar Aalto. It is located in the district of Töölö, along Mannerheimintie and the southern end of the Töölönlahti bay.
	Library Oodi (Helsingin keskustakirjasto Oodi)	2018	The Helsinki Central Library Oodi is the central library of Helsinki, inaugurated late 2018. In addition to usual library amenities, the library includes event spaces and an indoor movie theatre. It is located next to the Helsinki Central Railway Station.

== Churches ==
Image	Name	Year	Description
	Helsinki Cathedral (Helsingin tuomiokirkko)	1852	Helsinki Cathedral is the Finnish Evangelical Lutheran cathedral of the Diocese of Helsinki. The cathedral is a major landmark of Helsinki, overlooking the Helsinki Senate Square and adorning common depictions of the city's skyline. Many of Helsinki's parades, protests and major events are hosted at the steps of the cathedral. It is located in the neighborhood of Kruununhaka.
	Uspenski Cathedral (Uspenskin katedraali)	1868	Uspenski Cathedral is the main cathedral of the Orthodox Church of Finland. Uspenski Cathedral is also claimed to be the largest Orthodox church in Western Europe. It is located on a hill in Katajanokka.
	St. John's Church (Johanneksenkirkko)	1891	St. John's Church is a Gothic Revival style Lutheran church in Ullanlinna. It is the largest stone church in Finland by seating capacity, and the third largest church in Finland overall.
	Kallio Church (Kallion kirkko)	1912	Kallio Church is a Lutheran church in the Kallio district. It was designed by Lars Sonck and represents National Romanticism with Art Nouveau influences. The church is on a hill, and is visible far as the northern end point of a 2.5 kilometres (1.6 mi) long street axis made up of three streets: Kopernikuksenkatu, Siltasaarenkatu, and Unioninkatu. The coastline of Estonia is visible from atop the tower.
	Temppeliaukio Church (Temppeliaukion kirkko)	1969	Built directly into granite bedrock, Temppeliaukio Church is a unique tourist attraction and the second most visited church in Helsinki. Also known as the Rock Church, it is located inside a hill in Töölö.

== Monuments ==
Image	Name	Year	Description
	Three Smiths Statue (Kolmen sepän patsas)	1932	The Three Smiths Statue is a sculpture by Felix Nylund, situated in the Three Smiths Square at the intersection of Aleksanterinkatu and Mannerheimintie. The bronze statue depicts three naked smiths hammering on an anvil. Due to its central location around many of Helsinki's points of interest, the statue is a popular meeting place and a navigational point for sightseeing.
	Equestrian statue of Marshal Mannerheim (Marsalkka Mannerheimin ratsastajapatsas)	1960	The Equestrian statue of Marshal Mannerheim is a bronze statue of Marshal of Finland Carl Gustaf Emil Mannerheim, by Aimo Tukiainen. It stands along Mannerheimintie, next to the Kiasma museum of contemporary art.
	Sibelius monument (Sibelius-monumentti)	1967	The Sibelius Monument by Eila Hiltunen is dedicated to the Finnish composer Jean Sibelius (1865–1957). The monument is located at the Sibelius Park in the district of Töölö.

== Museums ==
Image	Name	Type	Description
	Finnish National Gallery: Ateneum (Ateneumin taidemuseo)	Art gallery	Ateneum is one of the three art museums forming the Finnish National Gallery. It is located in the centre of Helsinki on the south side of Helsinki Railway Square close to Helsinki Central railway station. It has the biggest collections of classical art in Finland, which include extensively Finnish art all the way from 18th-century rococo portraiture to the experimental art movements of the 20th century. The collections also include some 650 international works of art, including Vincent van Gogh's Street in Auvers-sur-Oise (1890). The Ateneum building was designed by Theodor Höijer and completed in 1887.
	Finnish National Gallery: Kiasma (Nykytaiteen museo Kiasma)	Art gallery	Kiasma is one of the three art museums forming the Finnish National Gallery, and is responsible for the gallery's contemporary art collection. The collections include works by around 8,000 artists. The museum is located along Mannerheimintie, across from the Parliament of Finland.
	Finnish National Gallery: Sinebrychoff Art Museum (Sinebrychoffin taidemuseo)	Art gallery	The Sinebrychoff Art Museum is one of the three art museums forming the Finnish National Gallery, and is responsible for the gallery's old European art collections. In addition, half of the museum acts as a historic house museum, displaying the 19th century estate of the Sinebrychoff family. It is located on Bulevardi in Punavuori.
	Helsinki Art Museum (HAM) (Helsingin taidemuseo)	Art gallery	Helsinki Art Museum, abbreviated as HAM, is an art museum hosting the city of Helsinki's own art collections, containing over 9,000 works. Nearly half of these are on display in public places such as parks, streets, schools and libraries. Its main gallery is located in Tennispalatsi in Kamppi, which hosts a small permanent exhibition of the works of Tove Jansson, including two large frescoes originally created for the restaurant of Helsinki City Hall.
	Design Museum (Designmuseo)	Other	The Design Museum is a museum devoted to the exhibition of both Finnish and foreign design, including industrial design, fashion, and graphic design. The building is situated in Kaartinkaupunki, on Korkeavuorenkatu, and is owned by the Republic of Finland through Senate Properties.
	National Museum of Finland (Kansallismuseo)	Other	The National Museum of Finland presents Finnish history from the Stone Age to the present day, through objects and cultural history. The Finnish National Romantic style building is located along Mannerheimintie and is a part of the National Board of Antiquities.
	Natural History Museum (Luonnontieteellinen museo)	Other	The Natural History Museum is one of the museums under the directorship of the Finnish Museum of Natural History, part of the University of Helsinki. It displays taxidermied animals, skeletons, remains of prehistoric animals, and minerals.

== Parks ==
Image	Name	Year	Description
	Esplanadi	1818	Esplanadi, colloquially known as Espa, is an esplanade and urban park situated between the Erottaja square and the Market Square. It is bordered on its northern and southern sides by the Pohjoisesplanadi (North Esplanadi) and Eteläesplanadi (South Esplanadi) streets, respectively. Aleksanterinkatu runs parallel to Esplanadi. The eastern end of the park houses the historic Kappeli restaurant, which opened in 1867. In front of the restaurant is an outdoor stage, which hosts live music performances. Centered in the park is a statue of Johan Ludwig Runeberg, created by his son Walter Runeberg. Other public art pieces include works by Viktor Jansson and Gunnar Finne.
	Kaivopuisto	1830s	Kaivopuisto is one of the oldest and best known parks in central Helsinki, situated along the southern coast of the city. Kaivopuisto offers several hectares of park, both on flat ground and on cliffs. The park also includes traces of stone fortifications built in the 18th century. Every summer, thousands of Helsinkians come to Kaivopuisto to sunbathe, to have picnics, or to practice sports. The largest hill in the park is a favoured slope for tobogganing during the winter. Kaivopuisto also includes Kaivohuone, a famous restaurant and nightclub dating from the 1830s, the Ursa Observatory, and the Villa Kleineh, the oldest villa in the area.
	Hietaniemi beach (Hietaniemen uimaranta)	1929	Hietaniemi beach, colloquially Hietsu, is a popular sand beach in the Töölö district, next to the Hietaniemi Cemetery. It is the most popular beach in central Helsinki. It is also a popular place for playing beach volleyball, and since 1995 the Hietsu Beach Volley tournament has taken place there.
	Haaga Rhododendron Park (Haagan Alppiruusupuisto)	1975	The Haaga Rhododendron Park is a public park containing various unique cultivars of rhododendron, located in the district of Haaga. Although originally used for breeding and research purposes, the park is now a popular attraction, especially in the early summer, when rhododendrons bloom.

== Performing arts ==
Image	Name	Year	Description
	Swedish Theatre (Svenska Teatern)	1860	The Swedish Theatre is a Swedish-language theatre located at the Erottaja square, at the end of Esplanadi. It was the first national stage of Finland.
	Finnish National Theatre (Kansallisteatteri)	1872	The Finnish National Theatre, established in 1872, is a theatre located on the northern side of the Helsinki Central Railway Station Square. The Finnish National Theatre is the oldest Finnish speaking professional theatre in Finland. It has 4 stages, two of which are located in the main building.
	Finnish National Opera (Kansallisooppera)	1993	The Finnish National Opera is the opera company of the Opera House, located on Töölönlahti bay in Töölö. The Opera House features two auditoriums, the main auditorium with 1,350, seats and a smaller studio auditorium with 300-500 seats. The Finnish National Opera stages four to six premieres a year, including a world premiere of at least one Finnish opera. Some 20 different operas in 140 performances are found in the opera's schedule yearly. The Ballet arranges some 110 performances annually, with some 250,000 visitors a year.
	Helsinki Music Centre (Musiikkitalo)	2011	The Helsinki Music Centre is a concert hall and a music center on Töölönlahti bay in Töölö, situated between Finlandia Hall and the museum of contemporary art Kiasma. The building is home to the Sibelius Academy and two symphony orchestras, the Finnish Radio Symphony Orchestra and the Helsinki Philharmonic Orchestra. The main hall seats 1,704 people.

== Shopping ==
Image	Name	Year	Description
	Stockmann department store	1930	Helsinki City Centre Stockmann is a culturally significant business building and department store, one of many owned by the Stockmann corporation. It is the largest department store in the Nordic countries in terms of area and total sales. The store is known for carrying internationally recognised luxury brands and for historically having a reputation as the primary high-end department store in Finland.
	Itis shopping centre	1984	Itis (formerly Itäkeskus) is a shopping centre in the district of Itäkeskus in East Helsinki. It has a leasable retail area of 81,218 m^{2} (874,220 sq ft), containing more than 150 shops; including restaurants, cafés and grocery stores, which makes it the fourth largest shopping centre in Finland. The shopping center is connected to Itäkeskus metro station, for example via the Tallinnanaukio square.
	Forum shopping centre	1985	Forum is a shopping centre opened in 1985 and located between the streets of Mannerheimintie, Simonkatu, Yrjönkatu and Kalevankatu.
	Kluuvi shopping centre (Kauppakeskus Kluuvi)	1989	The Kluuvi shopping centre is a shopping centre on Aleksanterinkatu in the Kluuvi district in central Helsinki.
	Kamppi Center (Kampin keskus)	2006	Kamppi Centre is a shopping and transportation complex in the Kamppi district in the centre of Helsinki. As a four-year construction project, it was the largest singular construction site in the history of Finland, involving the extensive and difficult redevelopment of the Kamppi district in downtown Helsinki. One of the first of its kind in Europe, the centre consists of central bus terminals for local and long-distance buses, the Kamppi metro station, a freight depot, an internal parking area (underground), offices and residential apartments, and a six floor shopping centre with a supermarket, shops, restaurants, night clubs and service points.
	Aleksanterinkatu shopping street	n/a	Aleksanterinkatu, particularly the western portion connecting the Helsinki Senate Square with Mannerheimintie, is Finland's busiest shopping street. In addition to being the location of the Stockmann department store and Kluuvi shopping centre, the street houses many international fashion and jewelry retailers. During the Christmas season, the street is officially designated Finland's joulukatu (Christmas street), with lighting and a parade. Other businesses located on Aleksanterinkatu include the Helsinki World Trade Center and the Citycenter shopping mall.
	Market Square (Kauppatori)	n/a	The Market Square is a central square located at the eastern end of Esplanadi, bordering the Baltic Sea to the south and Katajanokka to the east. From spring to autumn, the Market Square occupied by vendors selling Finnish food and souvenirs. HSL maintains a year-round ferry link from Market Square to Suomenlinna. The Presidential Palace and Helsinki City Hall are located adjacent to the Market Square.

== Other attractions ==
Image	Name	Year	Description
	Suomenlinna fortress	1748	Suomenlinna is an inhabited sea fortress built on six islands off the southern coast of Helsinki. Suomenlinna is a UNESCO World Heritage Site and popular with tourists and locals, who enjoy it as a picturesque picnic site. A ferry connects the island to the Market Square. The Swedish crown commenced the construction of the fortress in 1748 as protection against Russian expansionism. Today, there are about 900 permanent inhabitants on the islands, and 350 people work there year-round. There is also a minimum-security penal labor colony in Suomenlinna, whose inmates work on the maintenance and reconstruction of the fortifications.
Snow leopard in Korkeasaari Zoo	Korkeasaari Zoo (Korkeasaaren eläintarha)	1889	Korkeasaari Zoo is the largest zoo in Finland, located on the island of Korkeasaari near Helsinki city center. The zoo hosts roughly 150 animal species and a thousand plant species. It is run by a non-profit organization that aims to conserve endangered species. A ferry and water buses connect the island to the Market Square and Hakaniemi in summertime.
	Seurasaari open-air museum	1909	The Seurasaari open-air museum hosts old, mainly wooden buildings transplanted from elsewhere in Finland and placed in the dense forest landscape of the Seurasaari island. The island is located in western Helsinki, with a bridge connection to Meilahti. The island and museum are popular due to their historical displays and outdoor atmosphere. The height of the island's popularity is at Midsummer, when a bonfire is built on a small isle just off the island's coast.
	Linnanmäki amusement park	1950	Linnanmäki is the most popular amusement park in Finland. It is owned by non-profit Lasten Päivän Säätiö (Children's Day Foundation), which operates the park in order to raise funds to Finnish child welfare work. In 2017, the foundation donated a total of 4.5 million euros. Annually, the park is visited by over 1 million guests.
	SpåraKoff tram bar	1995	SpåraKoff is a HM V type tram converted into a bar in Helsinki. Known as the pub tram, the vehicle does circular tours of downtown Helsinki picking up passengers for a fee during summer months. It is operated jointly by Sinebrychoff, HOK-Elanto (part of the S Group), and Helsinki City Transport. A tour ("pub crawl") takes approximately 40 minutes, travelling from the Helsinki Railway Square to Kallio, Töölö, and the Market Square, while its passengers enjoy their drinks. In addition to scheduled public rounds, the tram conducts 2-hour-long reserved rounds, for private events and public outings.

== See also ==
- Tourism in Finland
- Lists of tourist attractions
