= Southern major district of Helsinki =

The Southern major district of Helsinki (Finnish: Eteläinen suurpiiri) (Swedish: Södra stordistriktet), is one of the eight major districts of Helsinki, Finland.

It covers the city centre and areas to the south and west of it. It is located roughly speaking south of the Pitkäsilta Bridge and west of the Töölönlahti Bay, and in addition it contains the island of Lauttasaari.

== Districts belonging to the Southern major district of Helsinki ==
The Southern major district covers the following five districts subdistricts:

- Vironniemi
- Ullanlinna
- Kampinmalmi
- Taka-Töölö
- Lauttasaari

== The five districts and their subareas ==
- 101 Vironniemi basic district (Swedish: Estnäs distrikt)

- 010 Kruununhaka (Swe: Kronohagen)
- 020 Kluuvi (Swe: Gloet)
- 080 Katajanokka (Swe: Skatudden)

- 102 Ullanlinna basic district (Swe: Ulrikasborgs distrikt)

- 030 Kaartinkaupunki (Swe: Gardesstaden)
- 050 Punavuori (Swe: Rödbergen)
- 060 Eira (Swe: Eira)
- 070 Ullanlinna (Swe: Ulrikasborg)
- 090 Kaivopuisto (Swe: Brunnsparken)
- 204 Hernesaari (Swe: Ärtholmen)
- 520 Suomenlinna (Swe: Sveaborg)
- 531 Länsisaaret (Swe: Västra holmarna)

- 103 Kampinmalmi basic district (Swe: Kampmalmens distrikt)

- 040 Kamppi (Swe: Kampen)
- 130 Etu-Töölö (Swe: Främre Tölö)
- 201 Ruoholahti (Swe: Gräsviken)
- 202 Lapinlahti (Swe: Lappviken)
- 203 Jätkäsaari (Swe: Busholmen)

- 104 Taka-Töölö basic district (Swe: Bortre Tölö distrikt)

- 140 Taka-Töölö (Swe: Bortre Tölö)

- 105 Lauttasaaren peruspiiri (Swe: Drumsö distrikt)

- 311 Kotkavuori (Swe: Örnberget)
- 312 Vattuniemi (Swe: Hallonnäs)
- 313 Myllykallio (Swe: Kvarnberget)
- 314 Koivusaari (Swe: Björkholmen)
