= Vironniemi =

District of Helsinki, Finland

Coordinates: 60.1703°N 24.9568°E

Location in Helsinki

Vironniemi (Swedish: Estnäs; literally the "Cape of Estonia" or the "Estonian Peninsula") is a district of Helsinki, Finland, forming the core part of the city centre, thus also the central location of the Finnish governmental and financial decision making, and the location of Helsinki's most important churches. Vironniemi is the location of the Presidential Palace, the Palace of the Finnish Council of State, the Senate Square, the Helsinki Cathedral, the Uspenski Cathedral and the main office of the Bank of Finland.

Other important sites in the district include the main building of the University of Helsinki, the Helsinki City Hall, the Helsinki Central railway station and the Helsinki main post office. Many banks and corporations have their headquarters in Vironniemi, and the Sokos and Stockmann department stores and Sanomatalo, the main office of Helsingin Sanomat, Finland's largest newspaper, are also found there. A part of the core of Finland's cultural life is also found here: the National Library of Finland, the Finnish National Theatre, Ateneum, Kiasma and the Helsinki Music Centre.

== History ==
Originally, a narrow bay called Kluuvinlahti extended south of Töölönlahti, reaching the site of present-day Esplanadi. At that time, the name Vironniemi meant the area eastwards of the bay mentioned above.

The birth of the Helsinki centre today dates back to 1640. At that time, the city centre was moved to Vironniemi from its birthplace at the mouth of the Vantaa river, the location of the present-day district of Vanhakaupunki.

The city grew and developed. It can still be seen: Old buildings dating back to the 18th and 19th century form about a quarter of the buildings currently in the district. Still in the 1850s, construction of the city was mainly focused in the Vironniemi area and south of it.

When the Kluuvinlahti bay was gradually filled in the 19th century, the name Vironniemi was disused in all except historical contexts. Only in the 1980s the name was restored, as the name of the main district, when division of the city into main districts was established.

== Districts and neighbouring districts of Vironniemi ==
The main district of Vironniemi is divided into three individual districts: Kruununhaka, Kluuvi and Katajanokka.

Neighbouring districts include Kaartinkaupunki in the Ullanlinna main district to the south, Kamppi and Etu-Töölö in the Kampinmalmi main district to the west, Siltasaari across the Pitkäsilta bridge in the Kallio main district to the north, and Sörnäinen to the east of the aforementioned district across the more eastern Hakaniemi bridge.

== Office and home to thousands ==
Vironniemi is a very important employer (35,040 offices, as of 31 December 2003) and also the home of 11,242 Helsinkians (as of early 2005). Over 80% of the district's apartments have been built before 1960, and a little over 10% in the 1980s, when production of new apartments was being directed towards Katajanokka.

The education level of the inhabitants of the district is the highest of all main districts in the city - 36.4% of the inhabitants have a university degree. 10.6% of the district's inhabitants are native Swedish-speaking (as of 1 January 2005), which is clearly higher than the city average. The unemployment rate is very low and the income level is above average.

Traffic connections in the district are excellent. Vironniemi is the endpoint or transit point of many tram, bus, train and ferry routes. Two of the stations of the Helsinki metro - the Rautatientori metro station and the Kaisaniemi metro station are located in the area. Traffic routes - streets, the rail yard and the piers - have taken up about 45% of the land area of the core of the city centre.
