= Helsinki City Centre =

A central major division of the Helsinki city

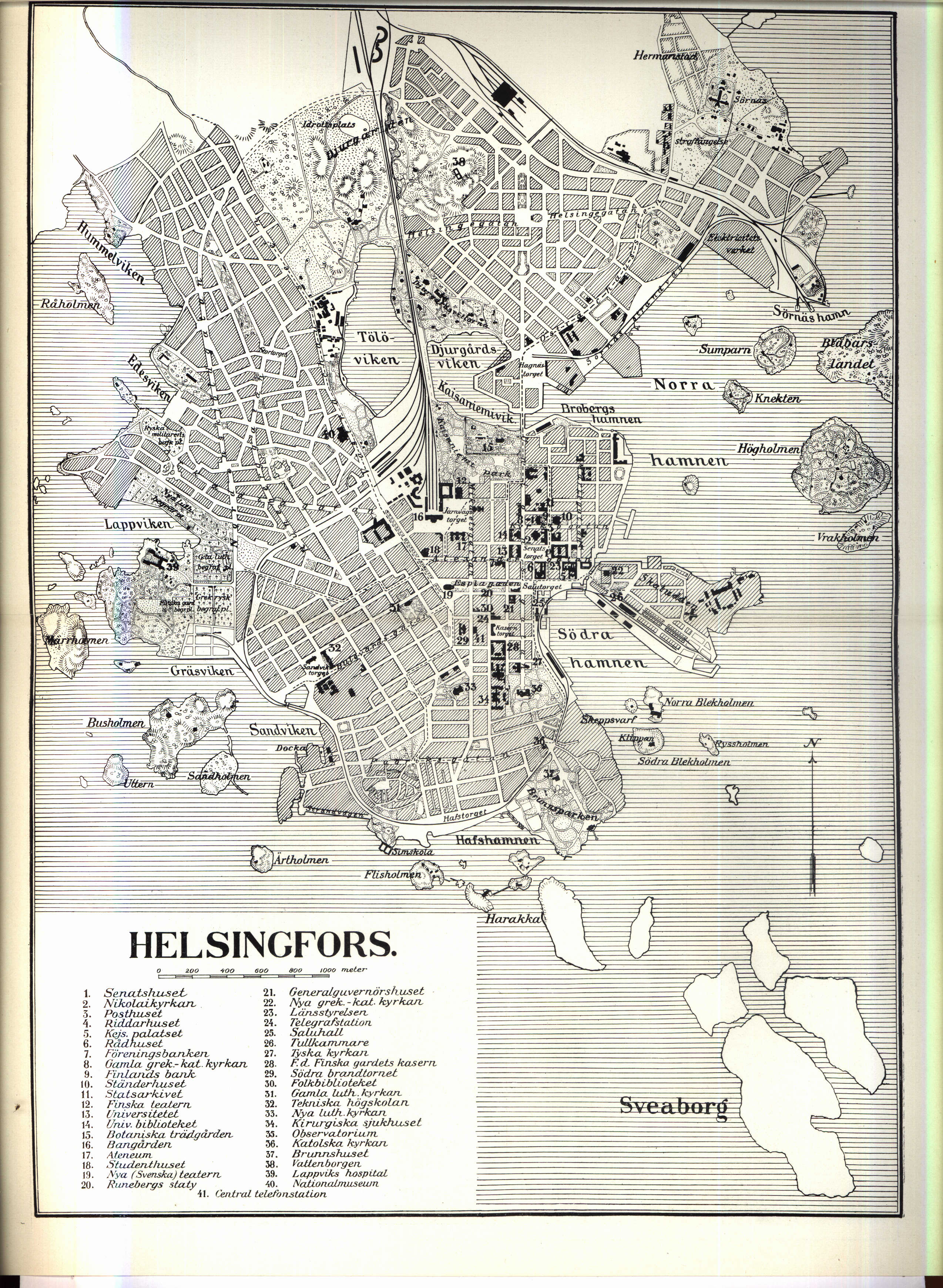
The Helsinki City Centre in the early 20th century before the annexation in 1906. The urban area ends at Taka-Töölö in the northwest and Vallila at the northeast, beyond which lies the countryside.

The Helsinki City Centre (Finnish: Helsingin kantakaupunki, Swedish: Helsingfors innerstad) originally referred to the area belonging to the city of Helsinki, Finland before the great annexation on 1 January 1946. After the annexation the names "Helsinki Centre" and "annexed area" were used, forming the area of Greater Helsinki together. The Helsinki Centre referred to the quarters 1 through 27. The city council often referred to the parts as the city centre and the suburbs (Finnish: kantakaupunki - esikaupungit, Swedish: stadskärnan - förstäderna). The area started to be referred to as the central business district in the 1960s.

In early 2014 there were 106,201 inhabitants in the southern major district of Helsinki.

== See also ==
- Subdivisions of Helsinki
- Helsinki urban area
