= Kampinmalmi =

District in southern Helsinki

Coordinates: 60.16201°N 24.923°E

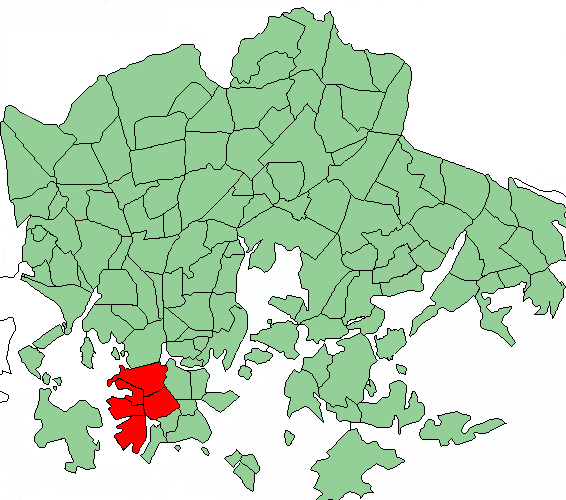
Districts of Helsinki. Kampinmalmi highlighted

Kampinmalmi (Swedish: Kampmalmen) is a district in southern Helsinki, Finland. It consists of five neighbourhoods: Etu-Töölö, Lapinlahti, Kamppi, Ruoholahti and Jätkäsaari.

Kampinmalmi is located east from Lauttasaari and south from Taka-Töölö. East from Kampinmalmi is Kluuvi, and south is Punavuori. As of 2005 Kampinmalmi is inhabited by approx. 28,972 people and its area is 4.07 km^{2}. Kampinmalmi provides 42,801 jobs which is more than in any other district in Helsinki.
