= Kluuvi shopping centre =

Kluuvi
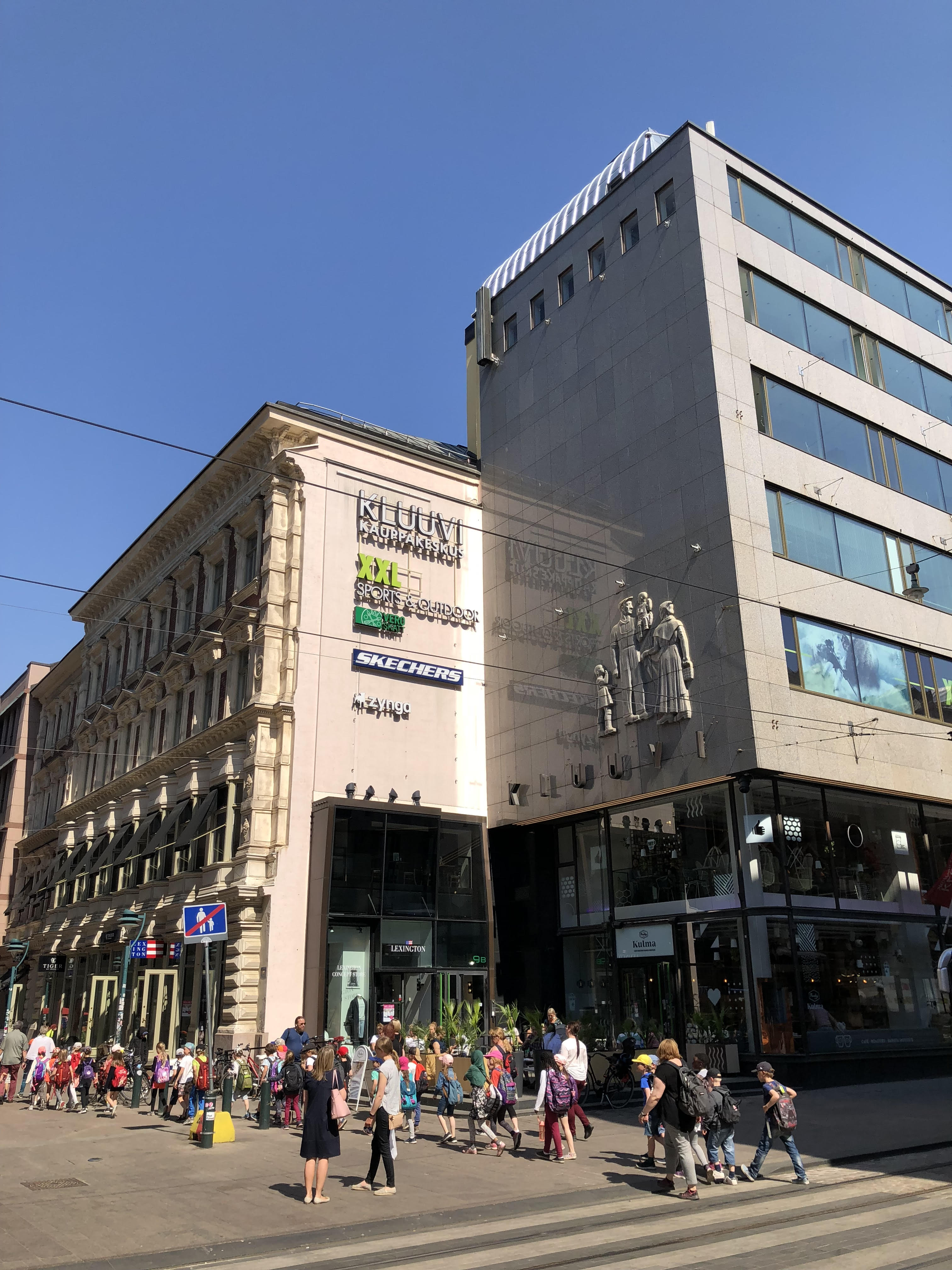
- Location: Kluuvi, Helsinki, Finland
- Coordinates: 60.169418°N 24.946314°E
- Opened: 15 March 1989
- Manager: Shopping Centre Manager Pia Rosvall
- Owner: ISV Kluuvi
- Architect: Castren-Jauhiainen-Nuuttila
- Num. of stores: 28
- Floor area: 15,900 m^{2} (171,146 sq ft)
- Floors: 4
- Parking: 725 bays
- Website: www.kluuvi.fi

The Kluuvi shopping centre (Finnish: Kauppakeskus Kluuvi) is a shopping centre on Aleksanterinkatu in the Kluuvi district in central Helsinki, Finland. The shopping centre has about 28 businesses (of which the most notable are Skechers, Nanso, and Joe & The Juice). Kluuvi offers a mix of some interesting Finnish retail concepts, cafees and restaurants. The shopping centre was opened on 15 March 1989, and was designed by the architect bureau Castren-Jauhiainen-Nuuttila. It was refurbished and reopened with a completely renewed commercial concept 14 October 2011.

The shopping centre comprises the entire western end of the Aasi (donkey) city block. It consists of five buildings (Aleksanterinkatu 7b, Aleksanterinkatu 9, Kluuvikatu 5, Kluuvikatu 7, and Yliopistonkatu 6), which are connected by a light yard covering the entire city block. The Aleksanterinkatu 9 building was an Elanto department store (Veikko Leistén 1952) with a granite façade of a relief of a working-class family, sculpted by Aimo Tukiainen. The Kluuvikatu 5 and Yliopistonkatu 6 buildings are old residential and business buildings from the 19th century, and only their façades remain to this day. The Aleksanterinkatu 7b and Kluuvikatu 7 buildings were designed by Castren-Jauhiainen-Nuuttila as supplementary buildings for the city block.

The shopping centre can be accessed with tram lines, as well as the metro from the Helsinki University metro station.

== Figures ==
- Businesses: 28
- Floors: 4
- Rentable area / shopping centre: approx. 10000 m^{2}
- Distribution of area in the shopping centre:
- Parking spaces (P-Kluuvi): 725

== See also ==
- Kluuvi
- Kaisaniemi
