= Kluuvi =

Coordinates: 60°10′N 24°57′E

Kluuvi Gloet
- Helsinki Subdivision
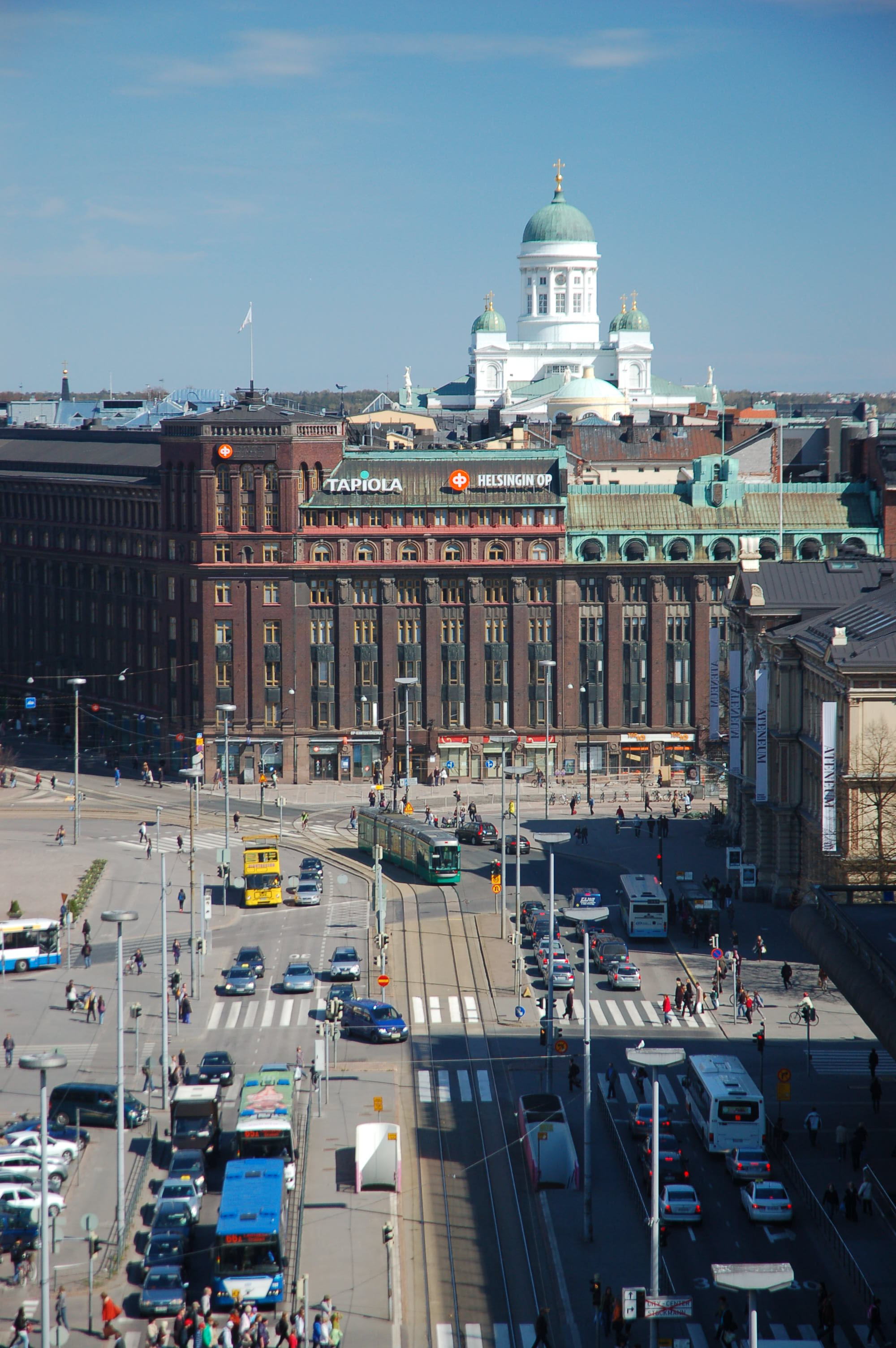
- Kaivokatu at Kluuvi

- Position of Kluuvi within Helsinki.
- Country: Finland
- Region: Uusimaa
- Sub-region: Greater Helsinki
- Municipality: Helsinki
- District: Southern
- Subdivision regions: none
- Area: 0.93 km^{2} (0.36 sq mi)
- Population (2003): 391
  - Density: 420/km^{2} (1,100/sq mi)
- Postal codes: 00100
- Subdivision number: 02
- Neighbouring subdivisions: Kruununhaka; Siltasaari; Kaartinkaupunki; Kamppi; Etu-Töölö; Linjat

Kluuvi (Finnish: [ˈkluːʋi]; Swedish: Gloet) is the commercial centre of Helsinki, Finland, and a neighbourhood in the Vironniemi district of Helsinki. The Helsinki Central railway station, Hotel Kämp and Hotel Arthur, the Helsinki main post office, the Stockmann, Kämp Galleria, and Sokos department stores, the Kluuvi shopping centre and the main offices of Finnish banks are located in Kluuvi. Kluuvi includes the central campus of the University of Helsinki, the Ateneum art museum, the Finnish National Theatre and the movie theatres Maxim, Kinopalatsi and Bristol. The northeastern part of Kluuvi, which includes the Kaisaniemi park, is commonly called Kaisaniemi, but it is not the official name of any neighbourhood in Helsinki.

The official name of the neighbourhood is very seldom used in everyday speech, Helsinkians usually refer to the area as "the centre" (keskusta) or "the core centre" (ydinkeskusta).

== History ==
The Finnish word kluuvi and the Swedish word glo mean a gloe lake - a bay that is closed up or closing up. The district was originally a bay called Kluuvinlahti in the Gulf of Finland, which eventually became swampy.

The bay stretched from Töölönlahti to the Esplanadi park. It was the last remnant of a strait that had originally connected Töölönlahti and Eteläsatama but had already closed in the 16th century because of the post-glacial rebound. This also caused the island east to it to become a cape, which was named Vironniemi.

The bay was filled in the middle of the 19th century. The odour of rotting seaweed and other plants can still be smelled near construction sites.

The street Vilhonkatu (approximately meaning "Wilhelm's street") was named in 1836, probably after the senator Otto Wilhelm Klinckowström, who oversaw the organisation of the Kaisaniemi park in the 1830s. The street had originally been named Wästra Mellan Gatan (Swedish for "western middle street") since 1820. The street got a Finnish name Vilhelminkatu in 1909, and was further renamed Vilhonkatu in 1928. The street Fabianinkatu has in turn been named after the governor-general Fabian Steinheil. Emperor Alexander I of Russia instructed Steinheil and state councillor Johan Albrecht Ehrenström in 1819 to give names to new streets planned in Helsinki and so they in a way acted as the first street name committee in the city. The street's unofficial Finnish name was Faapianinkatu until 1909.

The Helsinki Metro construction found a kluuvi in the district, when it turned out the planned site for a metro tunnel was supposed to go didn't have a solid rock base. The soft ground had to be artificially frozen before it was possible to dig through it to construct a solid base for the metro track.

Kluuvi
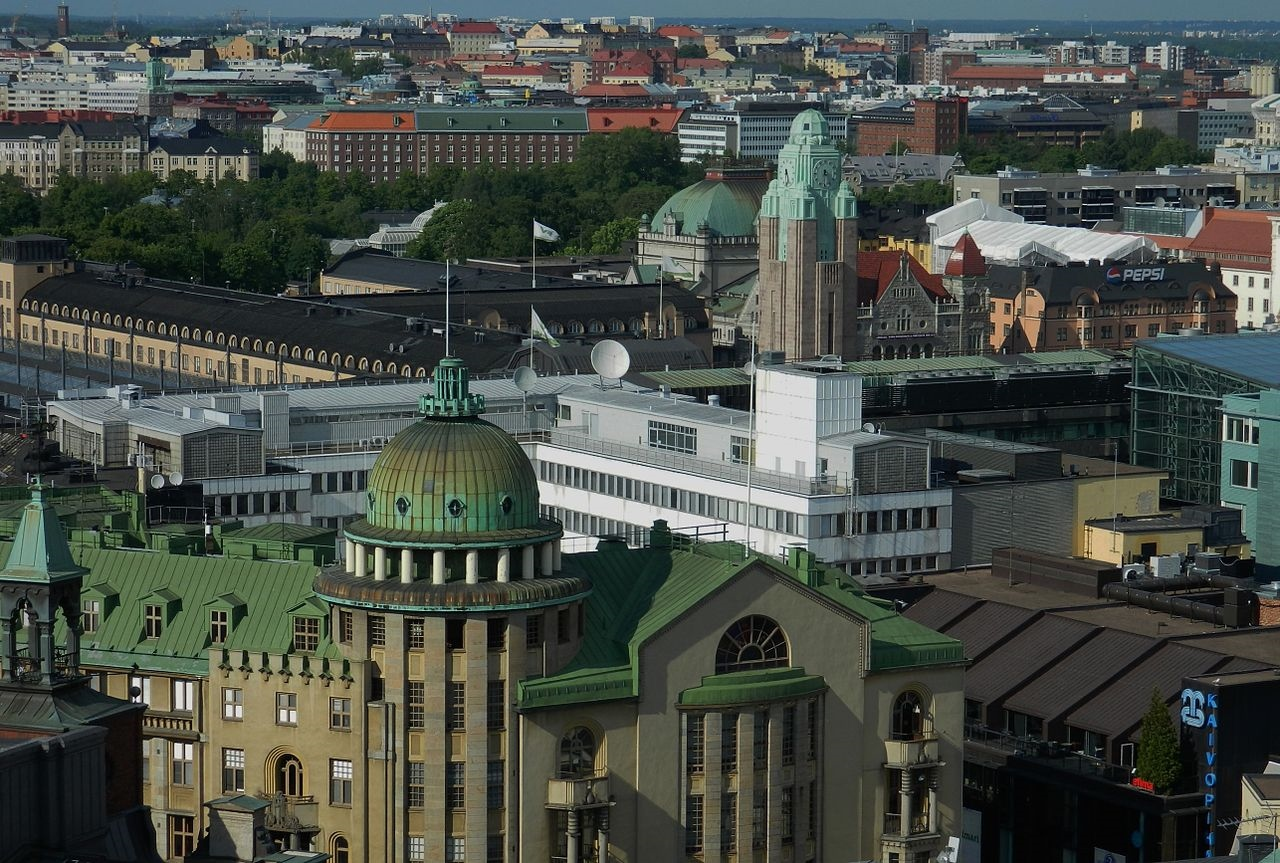
An aerial view of Kluuvi

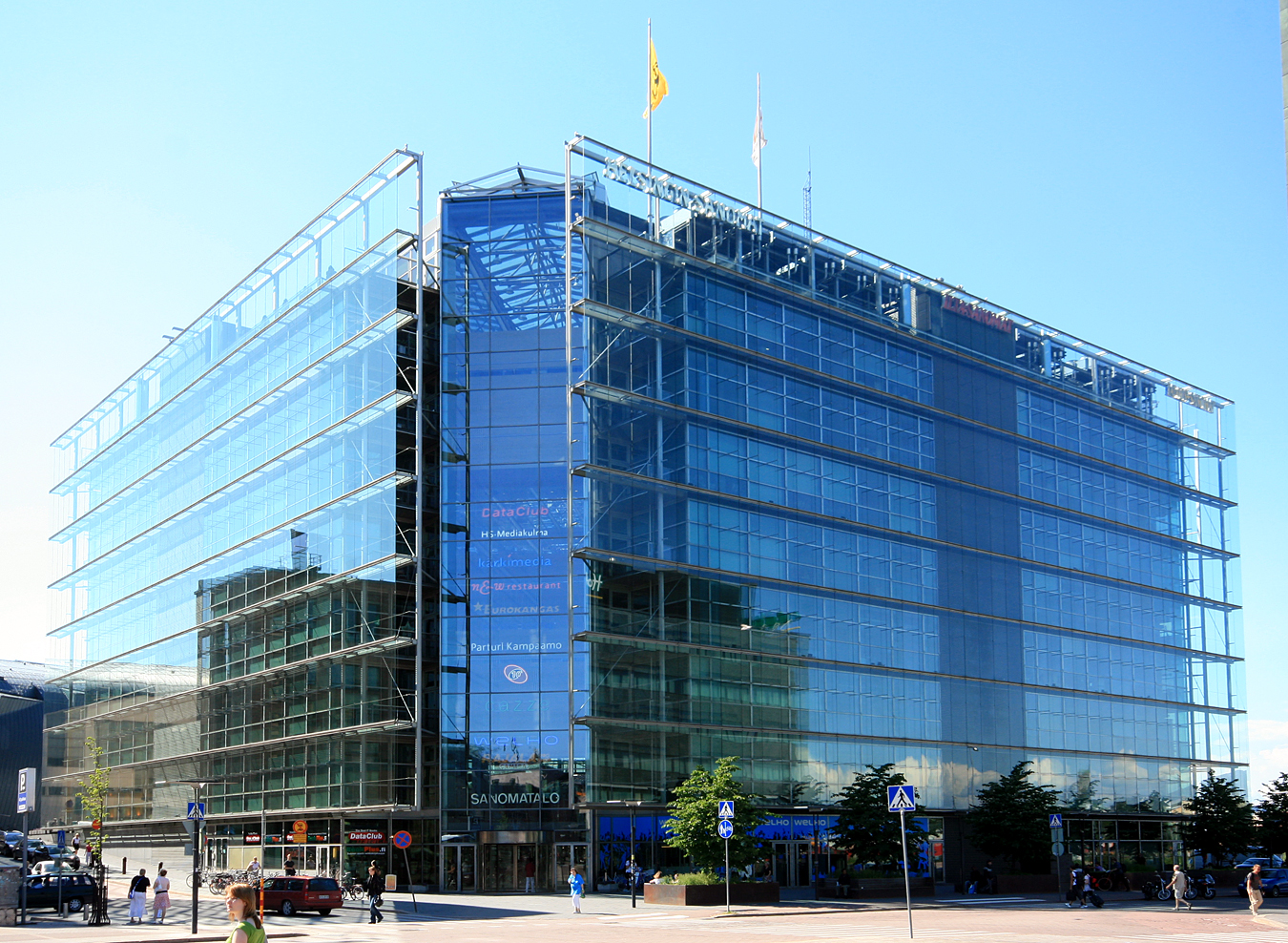
Sanomatalo press building houses the editorial offices of several newspapers such as Helsingin Sanomat

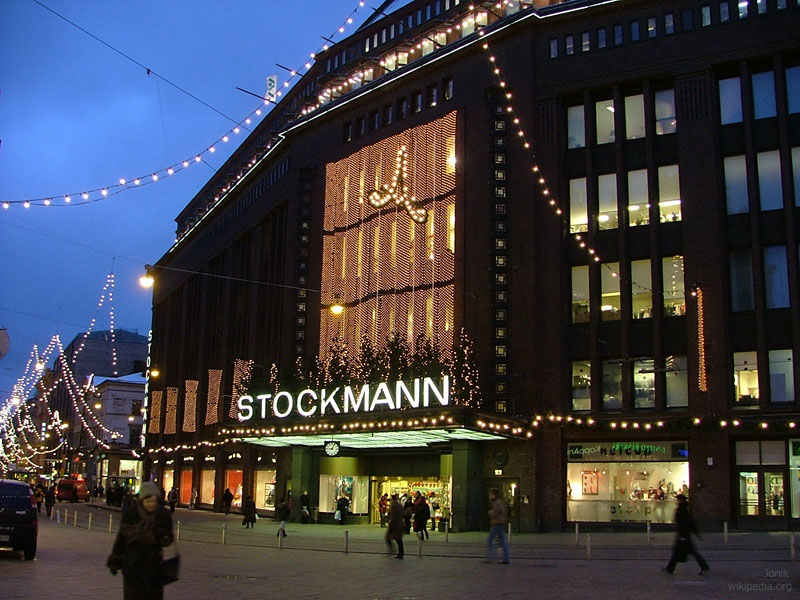
The Stockmann department store with its Christmas decorations

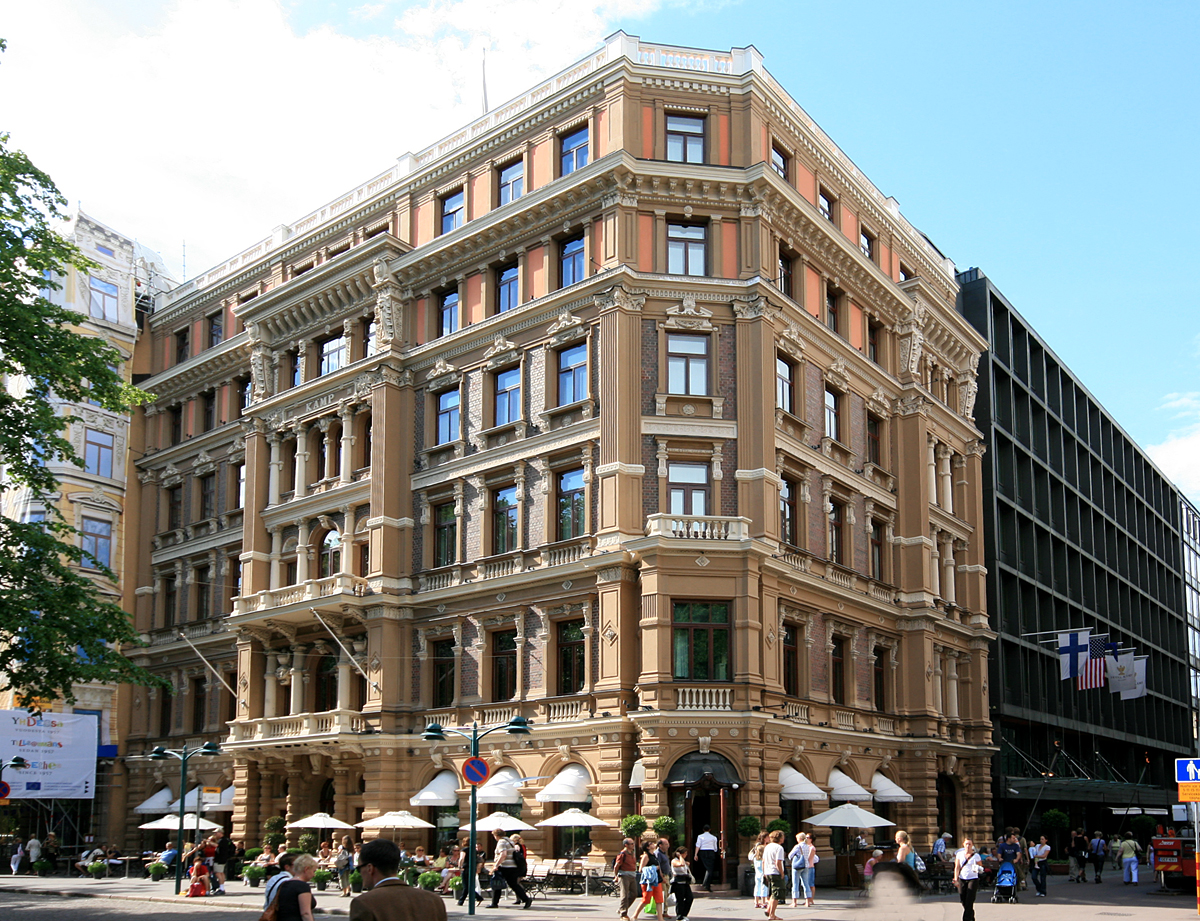
A historic Grand Hotel Kämp

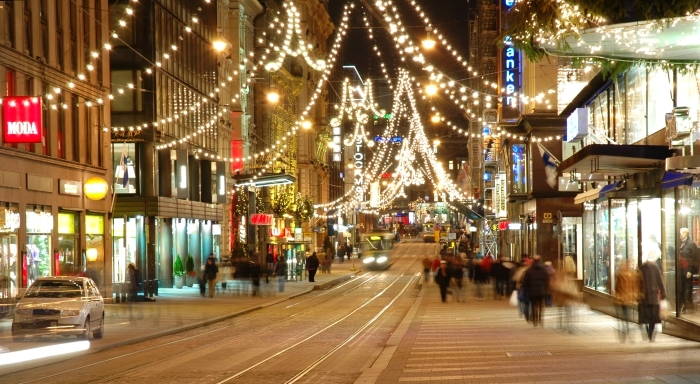
Aleksanterinkatu Christmas lighting

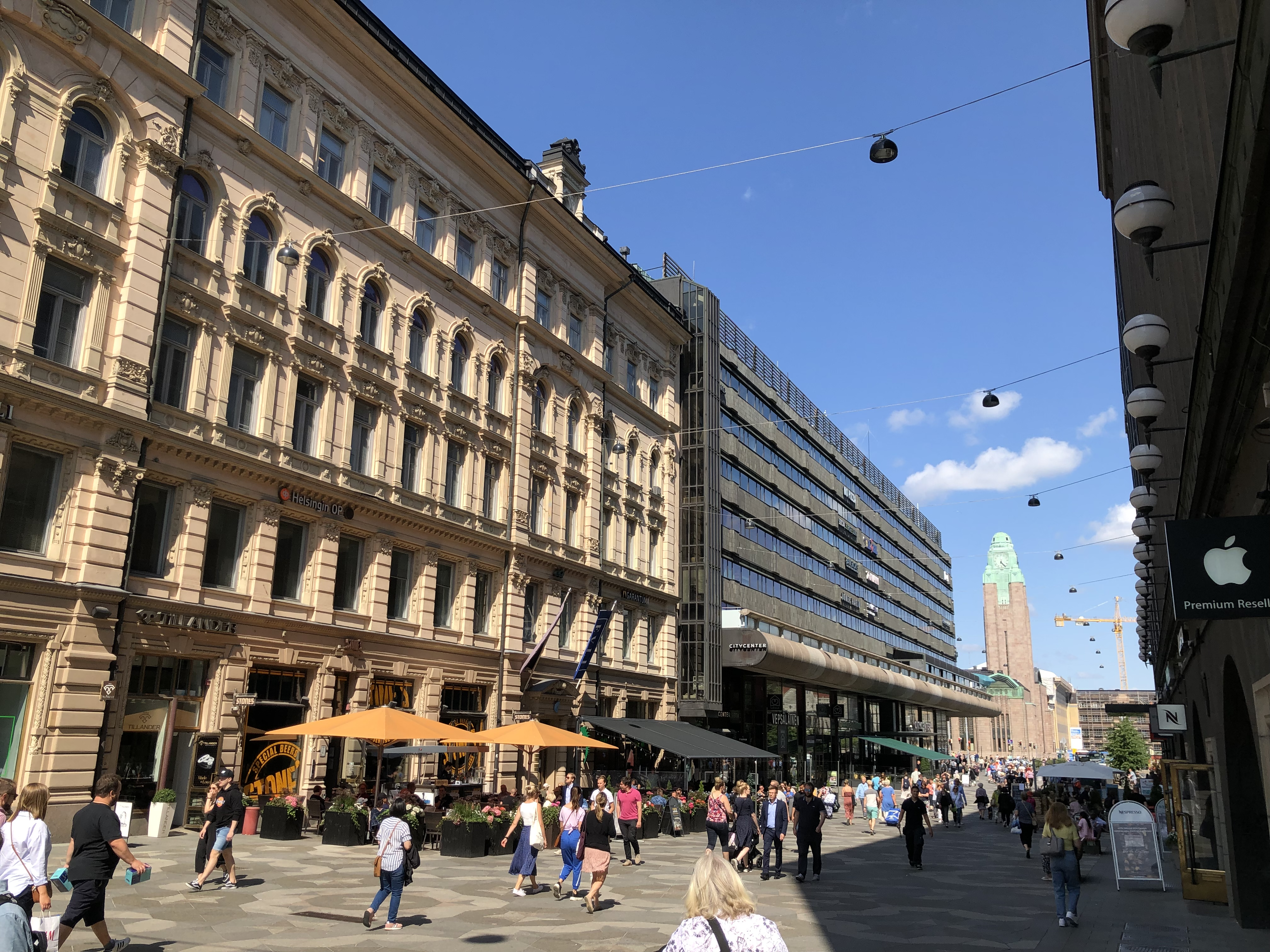
Keskuskatu, a pedestrian street

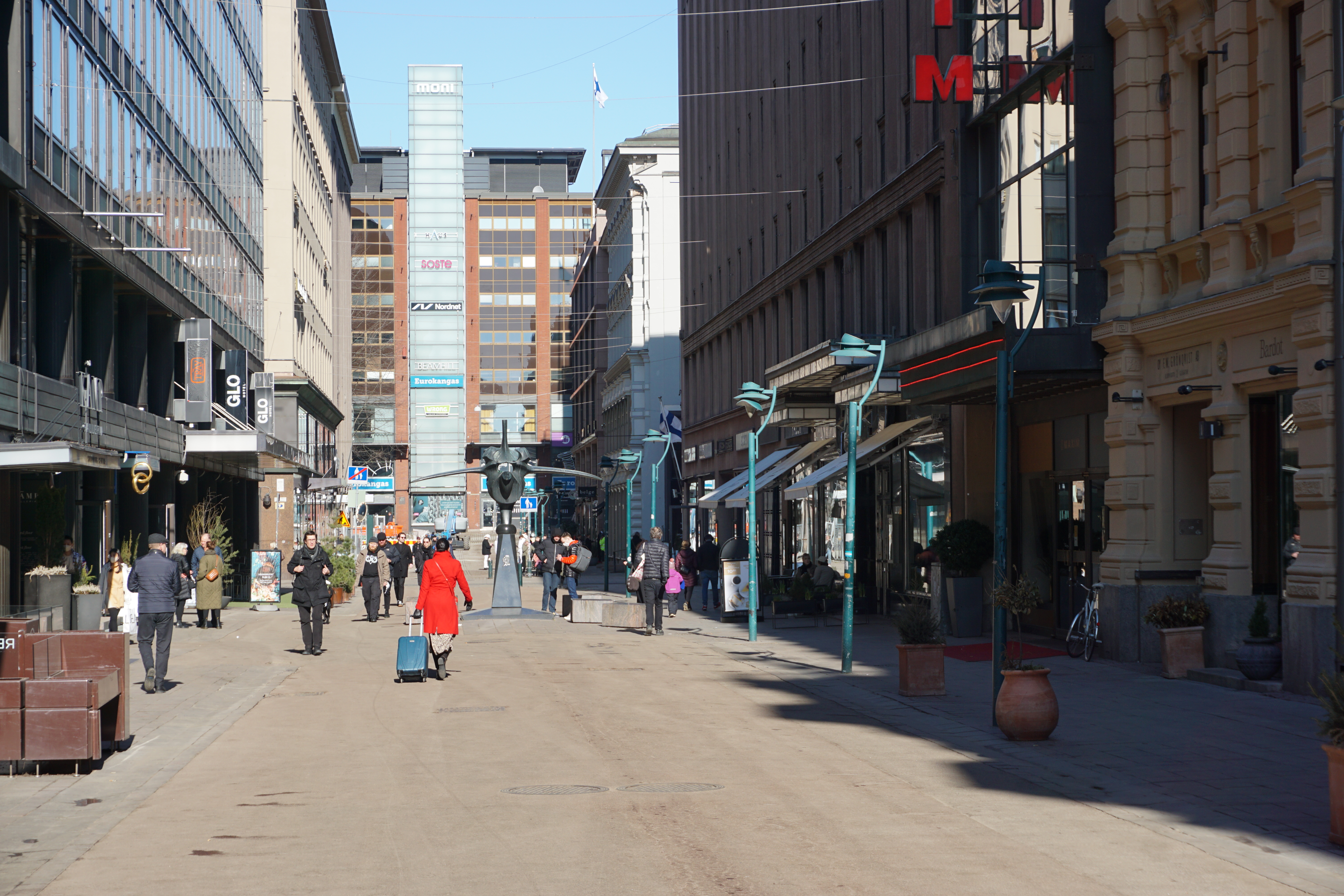
Kluuvikatu, another pedestrian street

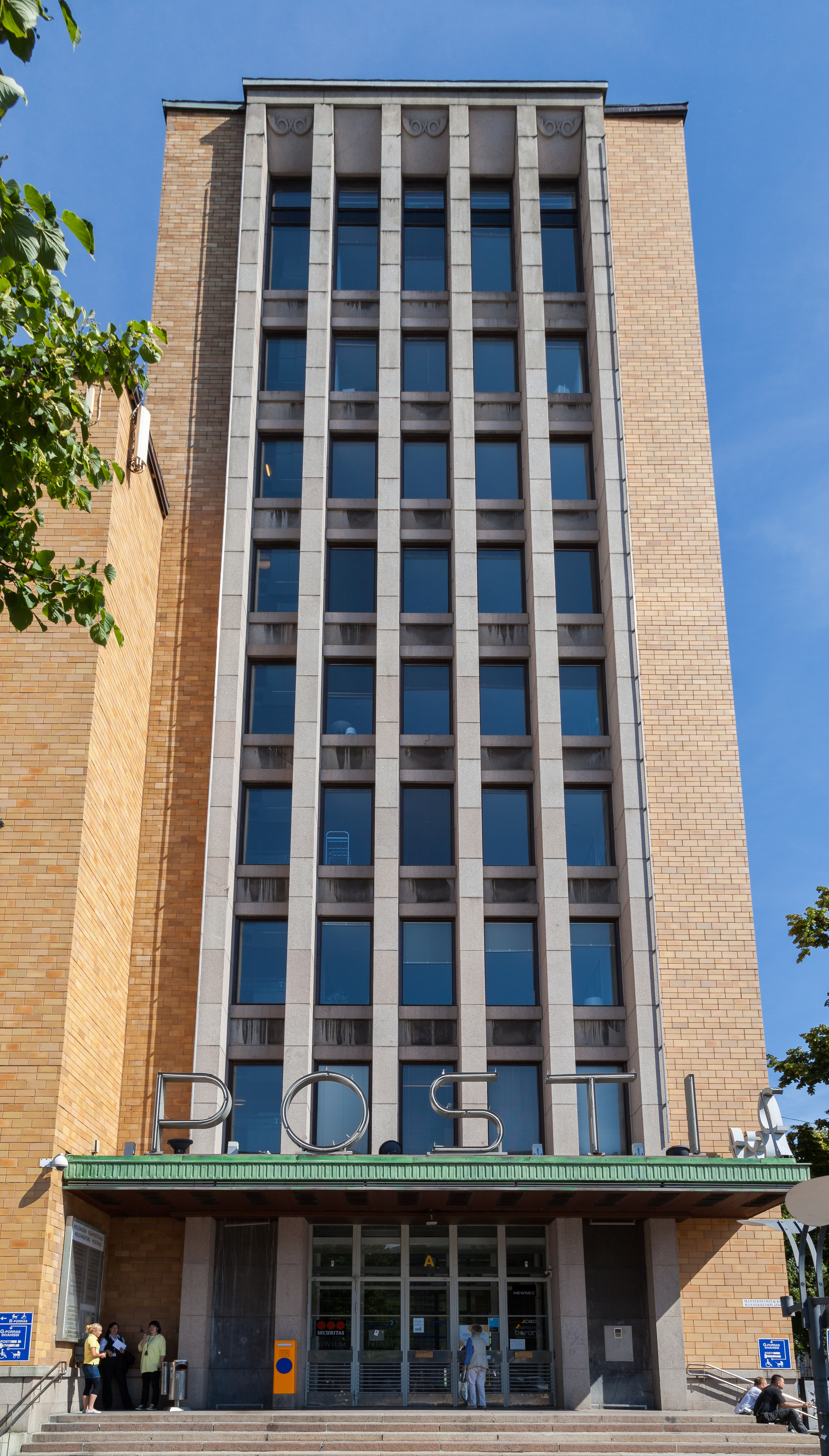
Main post office

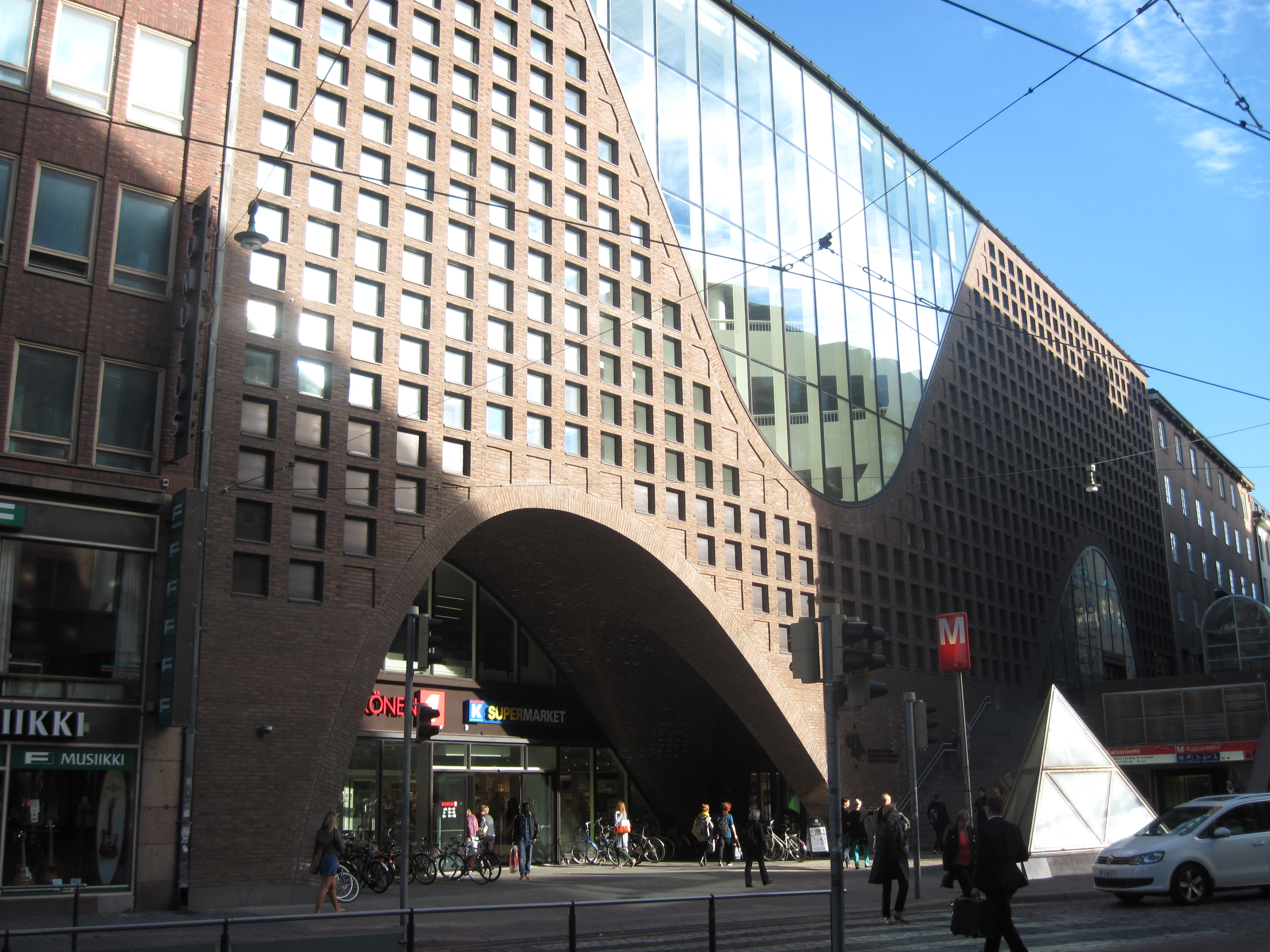
Kaisa House, a library of Helsinki University

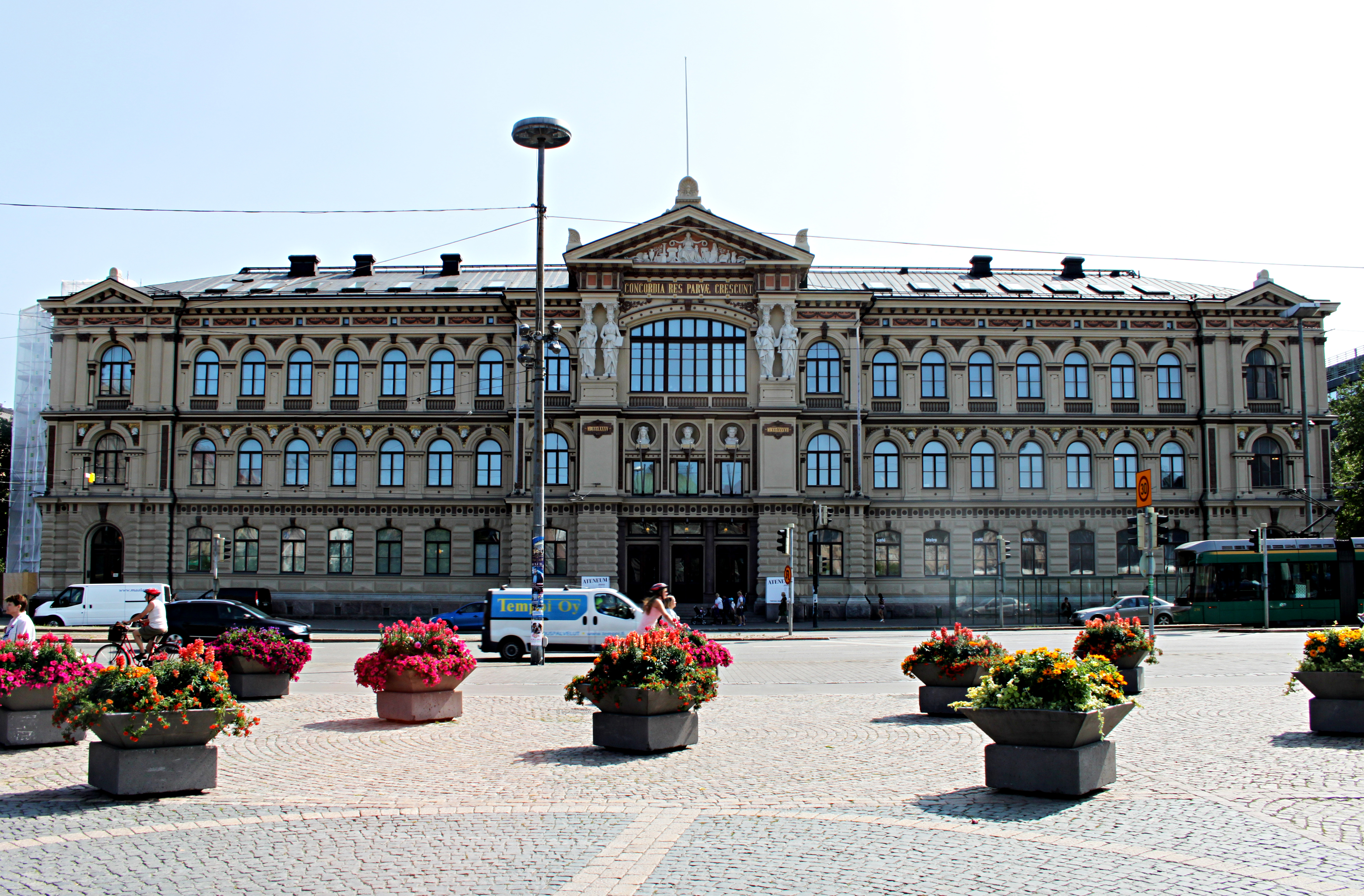
Ateneum, an art museum of Helsinki

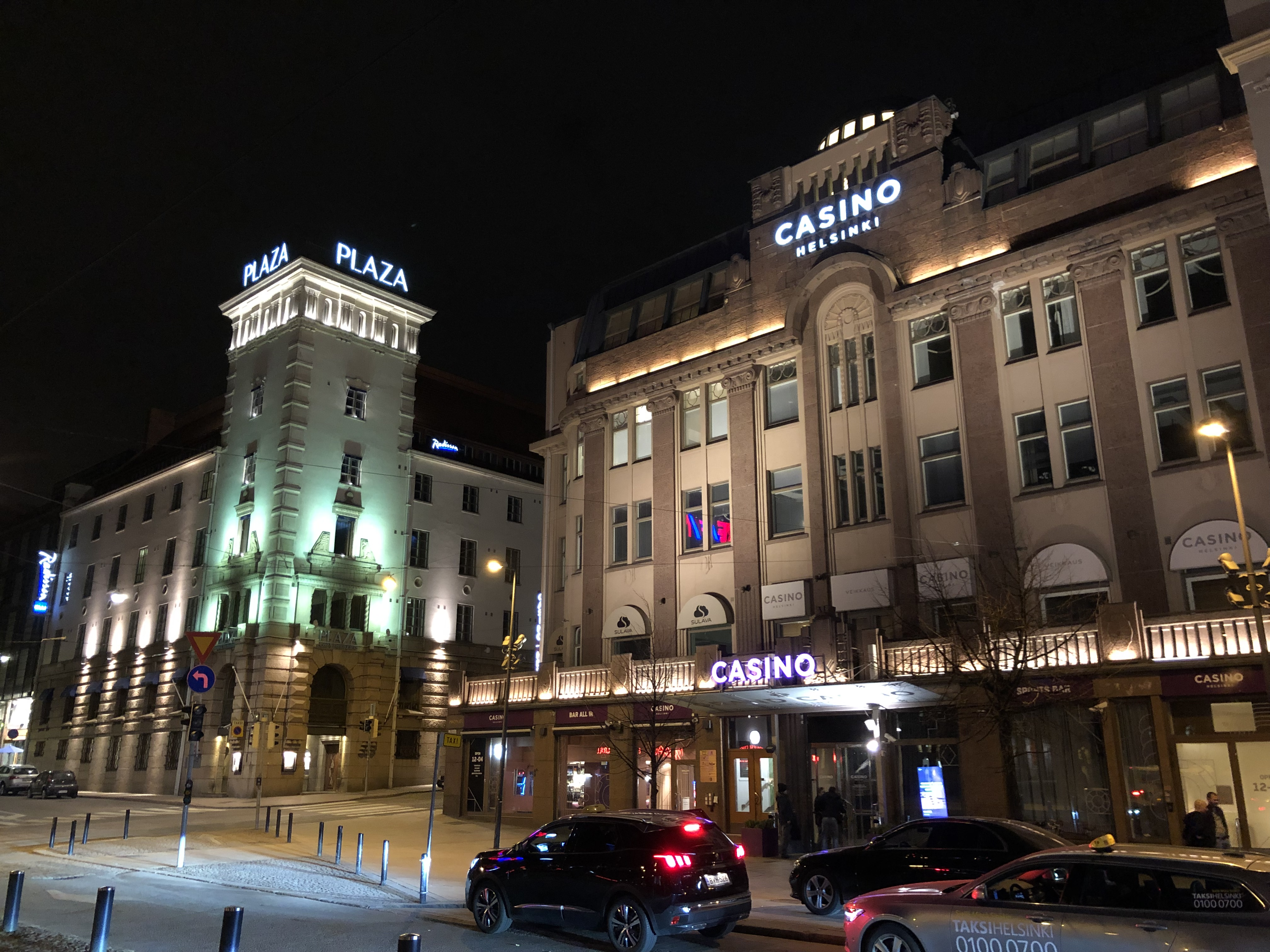
Casino Helsinki

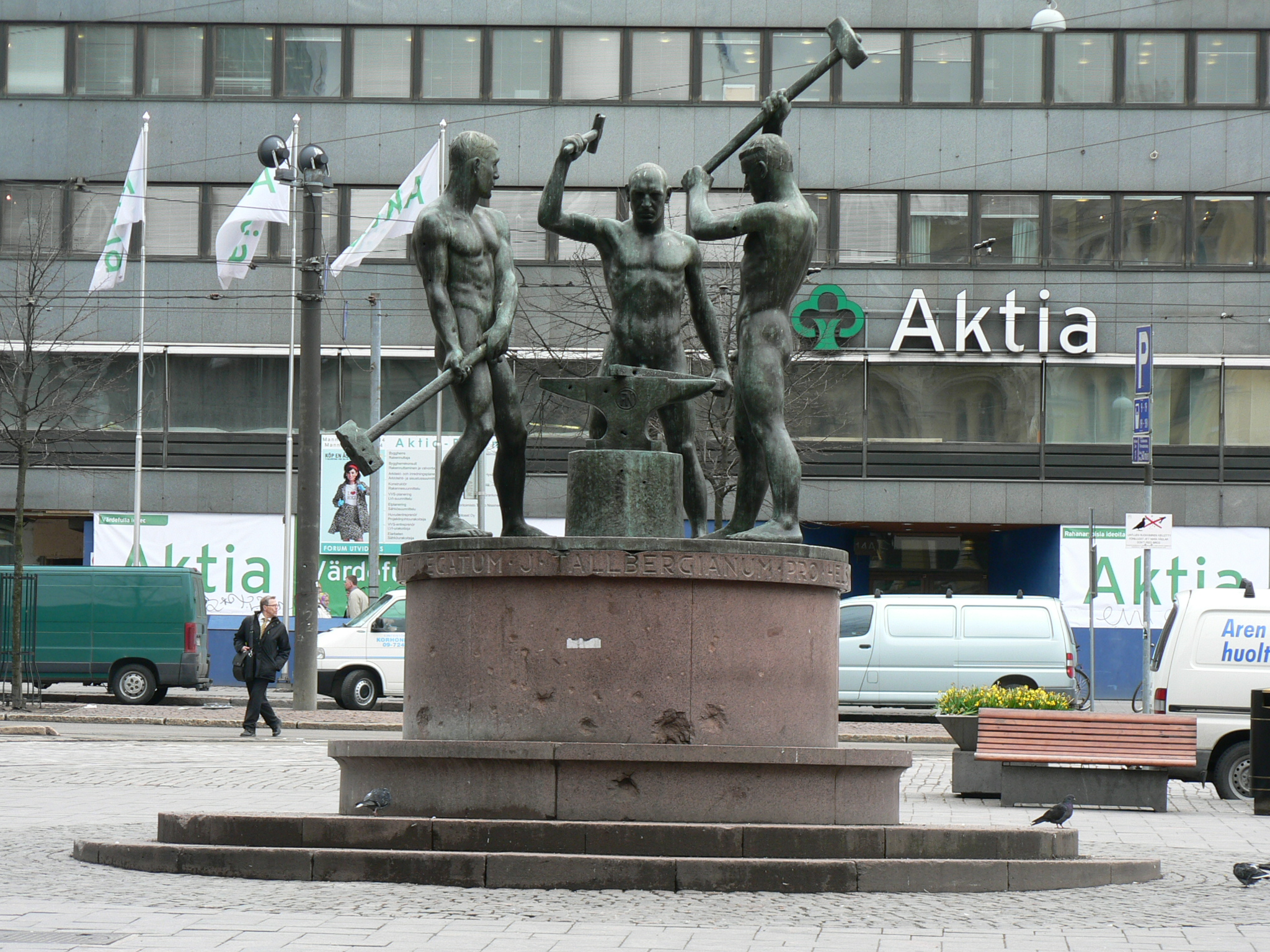
The Three Smiths Statue

== See also ==
- Kaisaniemi
- Kallio
- Kruununhaka
- Töölö
