= Three Smiths Statue =

Coordinates: 60°10′07″N 024°56′27″E

- Kolmen sepän patsas (Finnish)
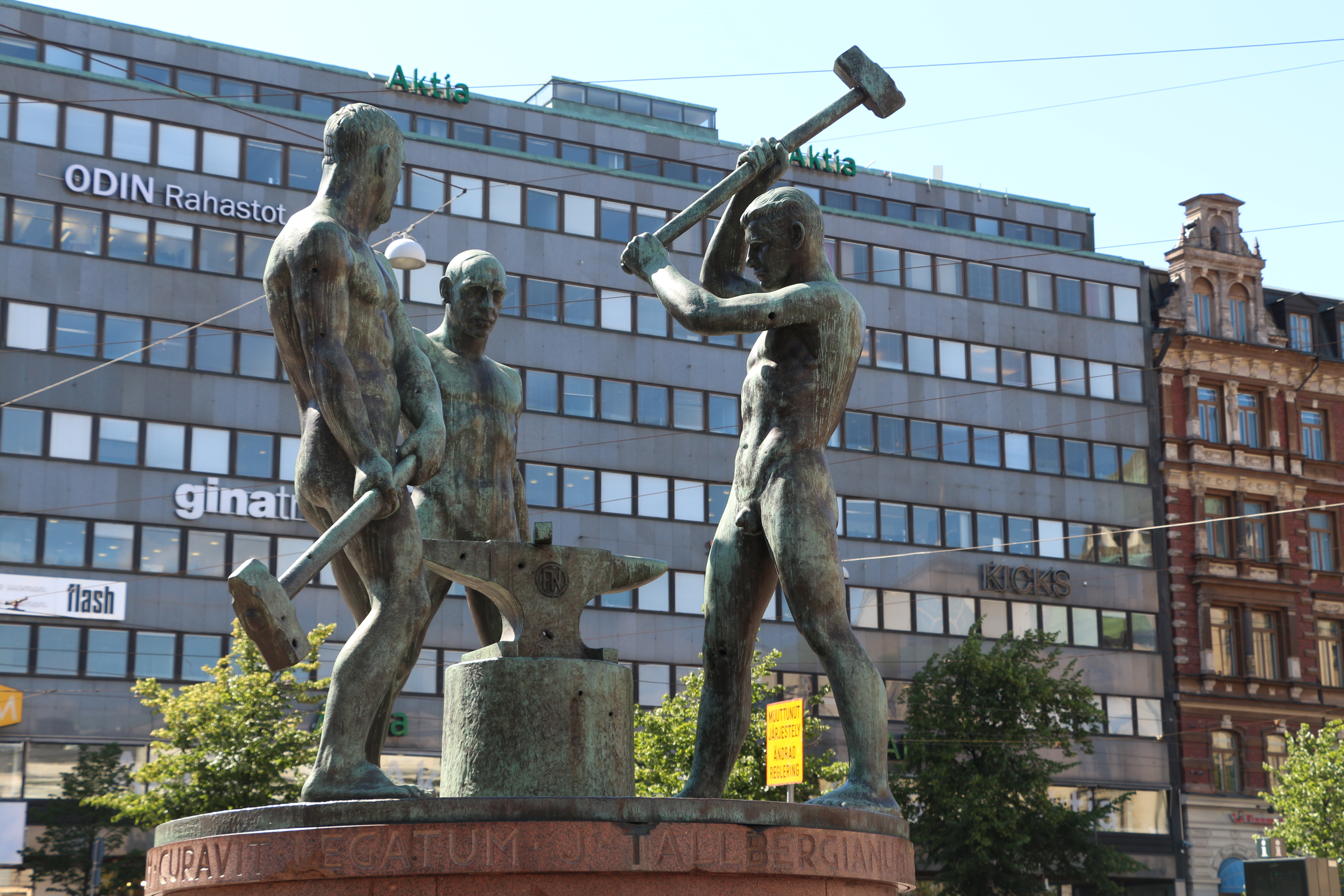
- The sculpture group in 2014
- Artist: Felix Nylund
- Year: 1932
- Medium: Bronze statue
- Subject: Three metalsmiths hammering on an anvil
- Location: Helsinki, Finland

The Three Smiths Statue (Finnish: Kolmen sepän patsas) is a sculpture by Felix Nylund, situated in Helsinki, Finland, in Three Smiths Square at the intersection of Aleksanterinkatu and Mannerheimintie. This realistic statue, unveiled in 1932, depicts three naked smiths hammering on an anvil.

Felix Nylund submitted a design for a smith statue for a memorial for Johan Vilhelm Snellman in 1913. In 1919 he designed a monumental statue with three smiths located on top of a stone pillar ten metres high. Neither of these designs was actually made into a statue, but Nylund took advantage of his previous designs when sculpting the Three Smiths Statue.

Of the three smiths depicted in the statue, one is a master smith holding the iron on an anvil. The other two smiths are hammering on the iron. Nylund used wrestlers from the gymnastics and sports club Jyry as models for the smiths' bodies. The master smith has the face of poet Arvid Mörne, the smith holding his hammer up has Nylund's own face, and the smith holding his hammer down has the face of sculptor Aku Nuutinen. It is said that mason Paavo Koskinen and police officer Sundström posed as models for the bodies.

The top part of the bronze statue's granite base is encircled by the Latin text MONUMENTUM – CURAVIT – LEGATUM – J. TALLBERGIANUM – PRO HELSINGFORS A.D. MCMXXXII ("The statue was erected with the help of a donation from J. Tallberg by Pro Helsingfors in the year 1932"). The statue was donated to the city of Helsinki by the Pro Helsingfors foundation, which had acquired it with the help of a monetary donation by the businessman Julius Tallberg. Tallberg's commerce house is situated at the northern end of the Three Smiths Square.

The statue was damaged in a bombing during the Continuation War in 1944. Marks of the damage can still be seen in the base of the statue, and the anvil has a hole caused by a bomb shrapnel.

The Three Smiths Square is a popular meeting place. There is a heating system underneath Aleksanterinkatu keeping the street free from snow and ice even in temperatures of -10 degrees Celsius. The heat comes from warm water flowing from the nearby buildings. Thus people can sit at the statue even in wintertime.

Upon close investigation of the statue, it can be seen that the positions of the smiths are more artistic than realistic: the smiths are standing so close to each other that if they were to actually hammer, they would hit each other on the head instead of the anvil.

The original gypsum models of the statue have been located in the library of the Finnish Workers' Academy in Kauniainen.

Nowadays the statue is annually capped with Santa Claus hats at the end of November at the Wappujoulu event of the University of Helsinki student organisation Limes.

In spring 2020 during the COVID-19 pandemic surgical masks were placed on the smiths and an effigy of the Coronavirus was placed on the anvil so it looked like the smiths were hammering down on the virus.

According to a survey done by Helsingin Sanomat, most Helsinkians view the location of the statue as the centre point of Helsinki.

== Derived works ==
The Linnanmäki amusement park in Helsinki hosts a 2014 sculpture Kolme seppää tauolla ("Three smiths on a break") by the English sculptor Nick Farmer, where the smiths have left their tools behind and are eating ice cream.
