= Lapinlahti, Helsinki =

Quarter of Länsisatama, Helsinki, Finland

Coordinates: 60°10′N 024°55′E

Lapinlahti (Swedish: Lappviken) is a quarter in Helsinki, part of the Länsisatama neighbourhood.

Lapinlahti Hospital, completed in 1841, was the first mental hospital in Finland.
