= Aleksanterinkatu =

Street in Helsinki, Finland

Coordinates: 60.169°N 24.951°E

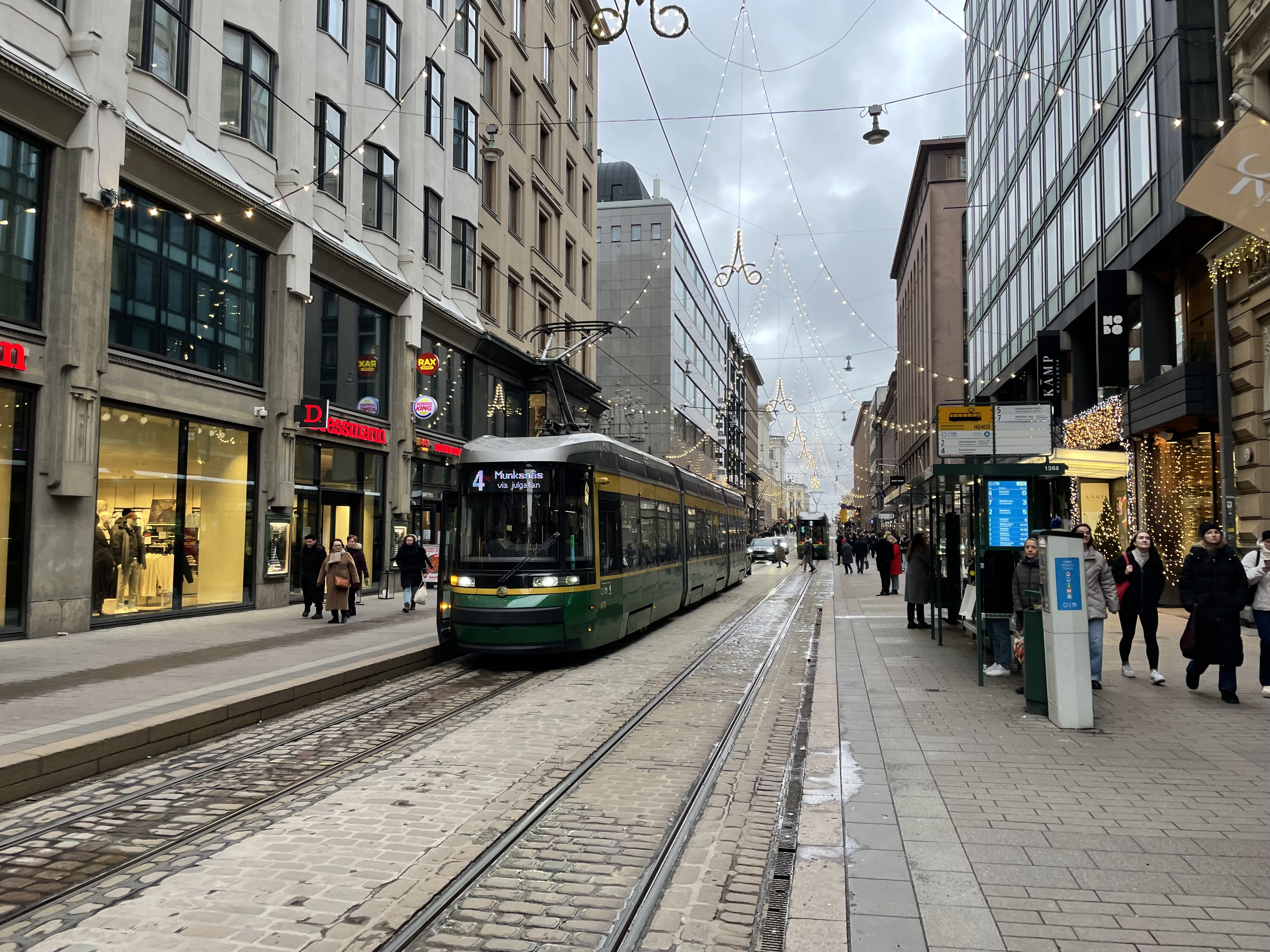
Aleksanterinkatu in 2024

Aleksanterinkatu (Swedish: Alexandersgatan; "Alexander Street") is a street in Kluuvi, the commercial centre of Helsinki, Finland. In the city plan by Carl Ludvig Engel, it was the Decumanus Maximus, the main east–west street in the city, crossing the Cardo, Unioninkatu (Union Street) at the corner of the Senate Square.

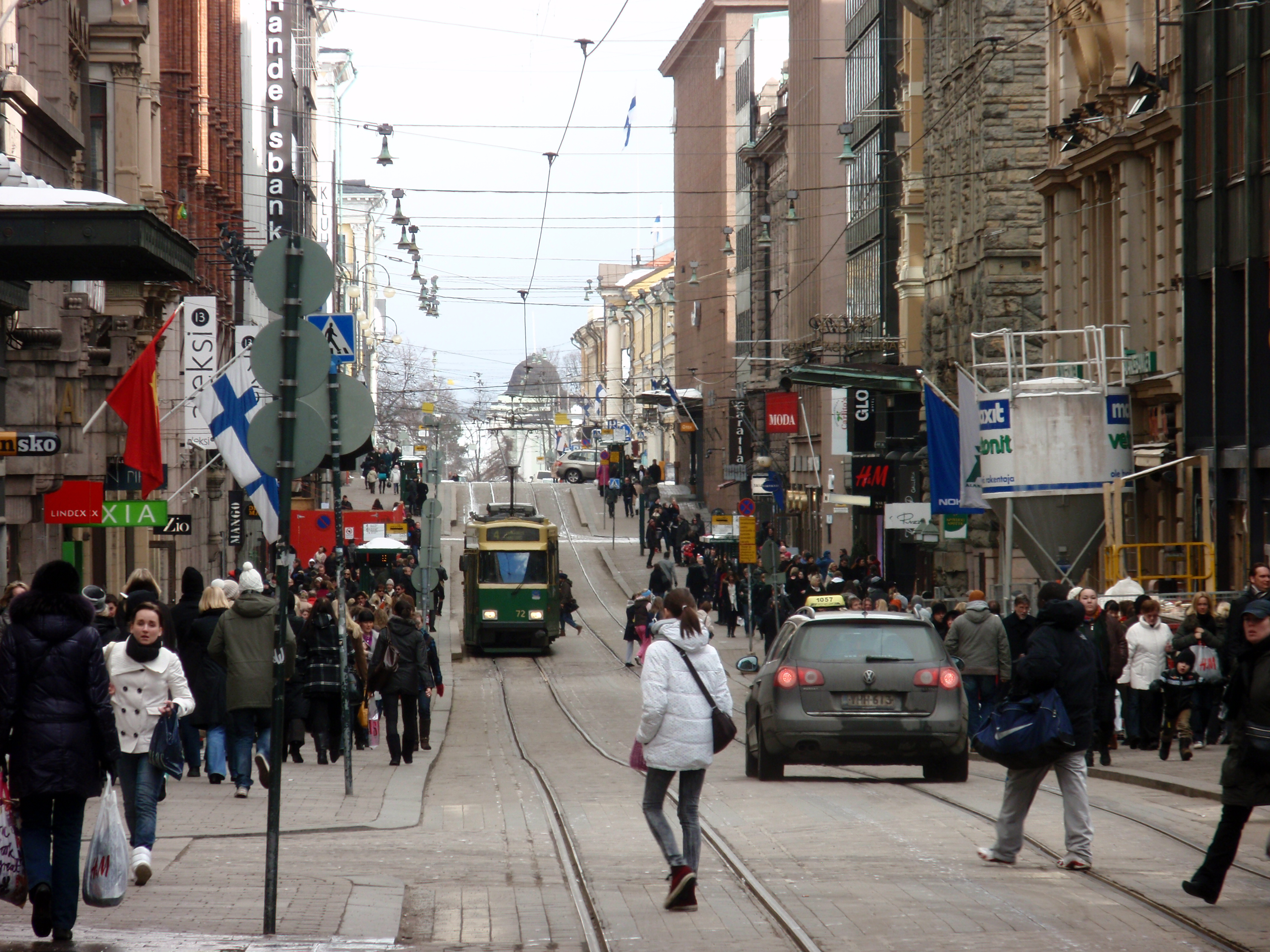
Aleksanterinkatu in 2010

The street begins near the Presidential Palace and continues to meet with Mannerheimintie, the longest street in Helsinki. It runs past several famous buildings, such as Ritarihuone (the seat of Finnish nobility), the Helsinki Cathedral, the former headquarters of Suomen Yhdyspankki (later Finnish main office of Nordea), the main building of the University of Helsinki, and the Stockmann department store.

The street, colloquially known in Helsinki as "Aleksi" (Swedish: "Alexen"), was named for Emperor Alexander I of Russia in 1833. It was originally named Suurkatu (Swedish: Storgatan), meaning "Grand Street", but was renamed after the Emperor's death in his honour. The streets crossing Aleksanterinkatu are named after the Emperor's mother, his brothers, and his sisters.

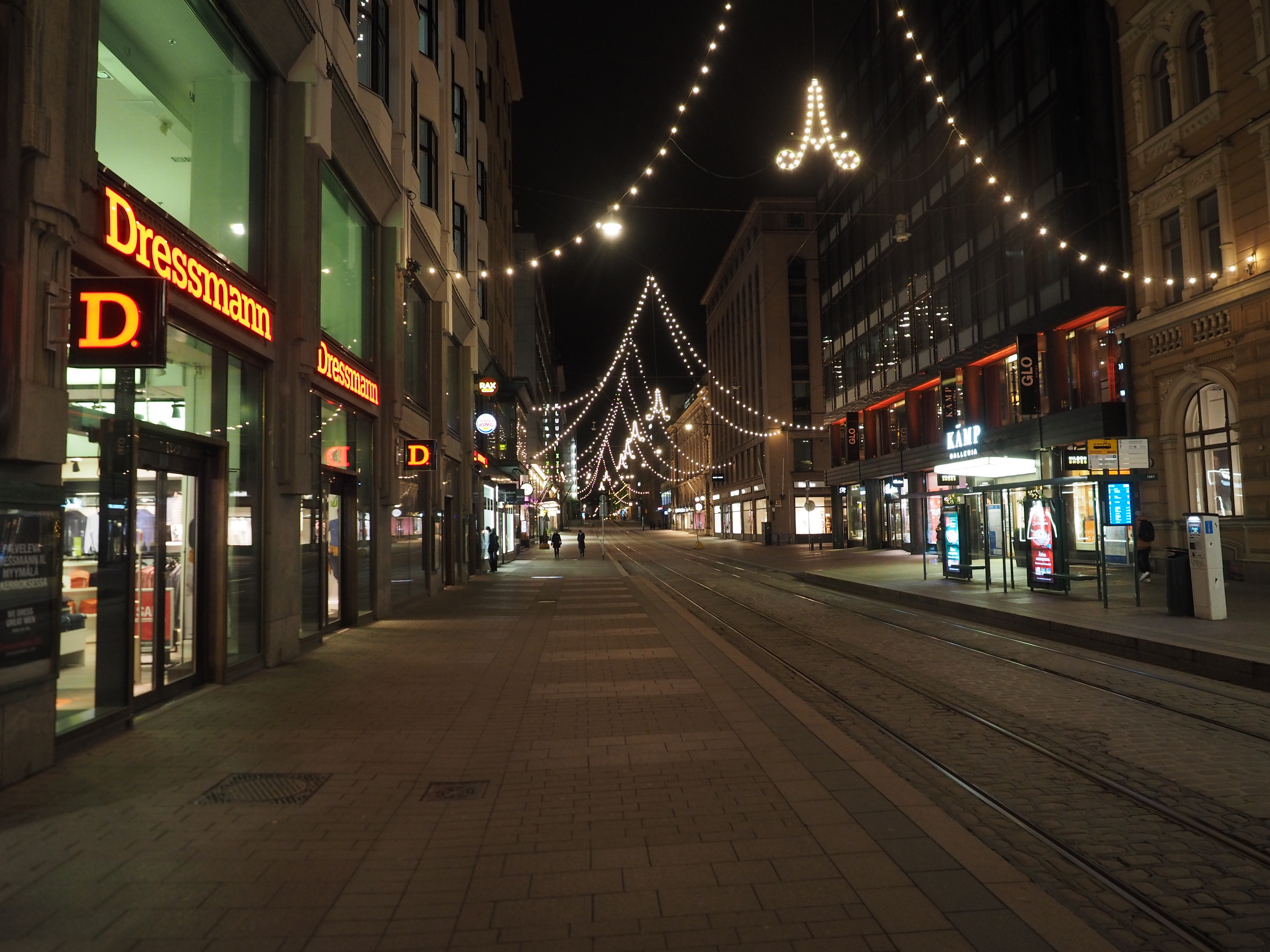
Christmas lights on Aleksanterinkatu.

Aleksanterinkatu has been the official Christmas street of Finland since 1949. At Christmas time, Aleksanterinkatu is traditionally decorated with elaborate Christmas lights between Unioninkatu and the Three Smiths Statue from late November to Epiphany.

The tram lines 2, 4, 5 and 7 run along Aleksanterinkatu. Of these, only 4 and 5 run along the street's entire length.

== History ==
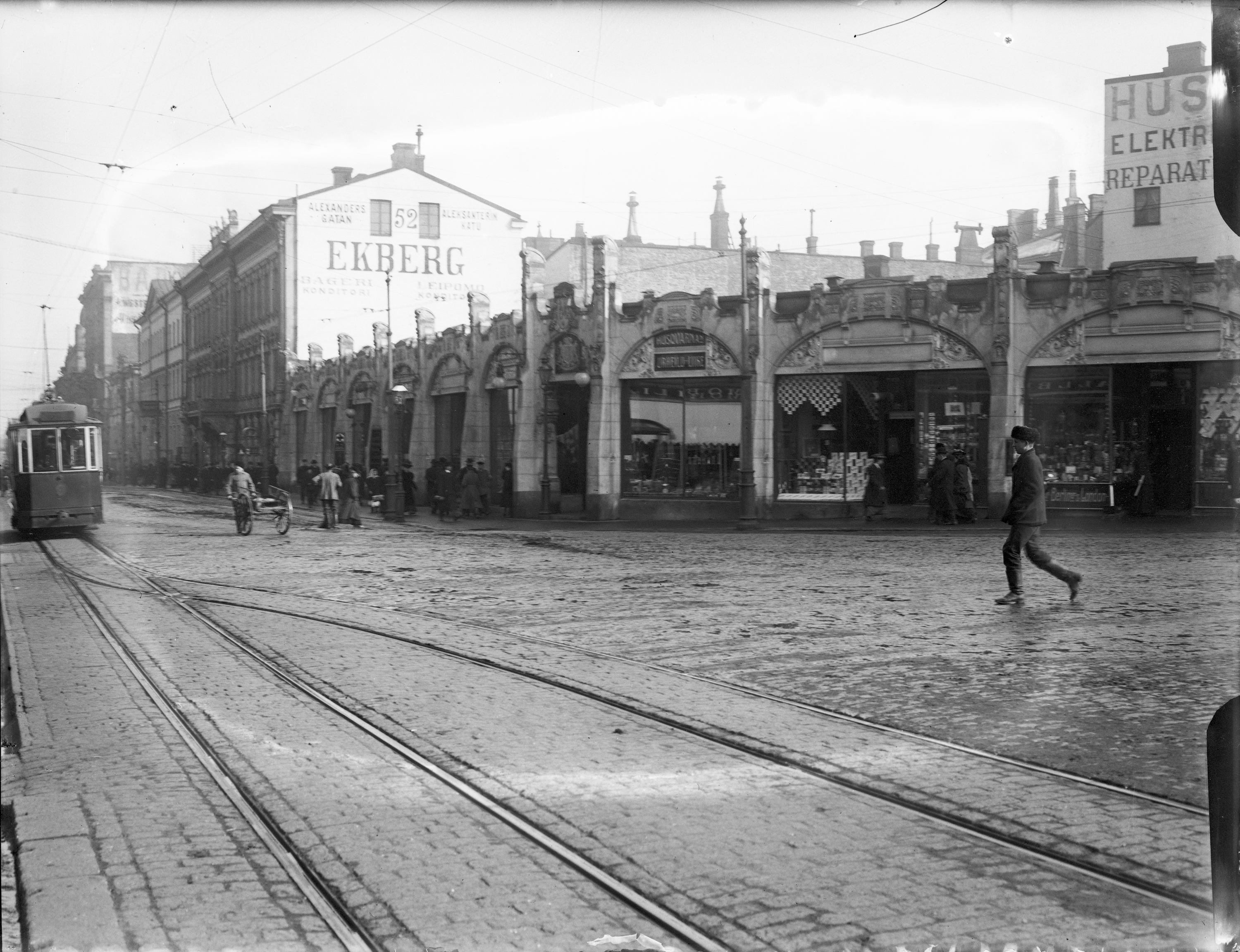
Aleksanterinkatu in 1900.

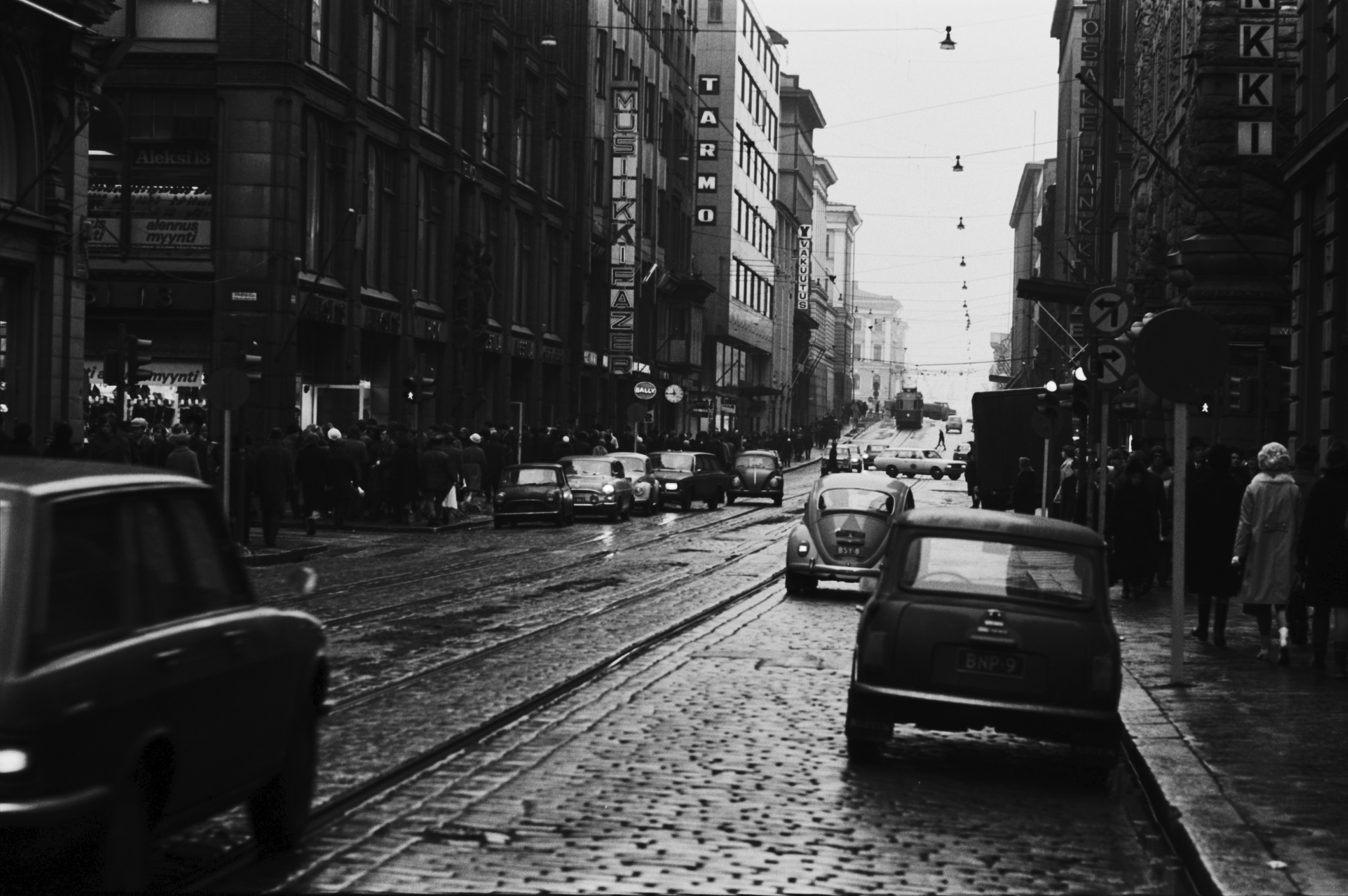
Private car traffic in 1971.

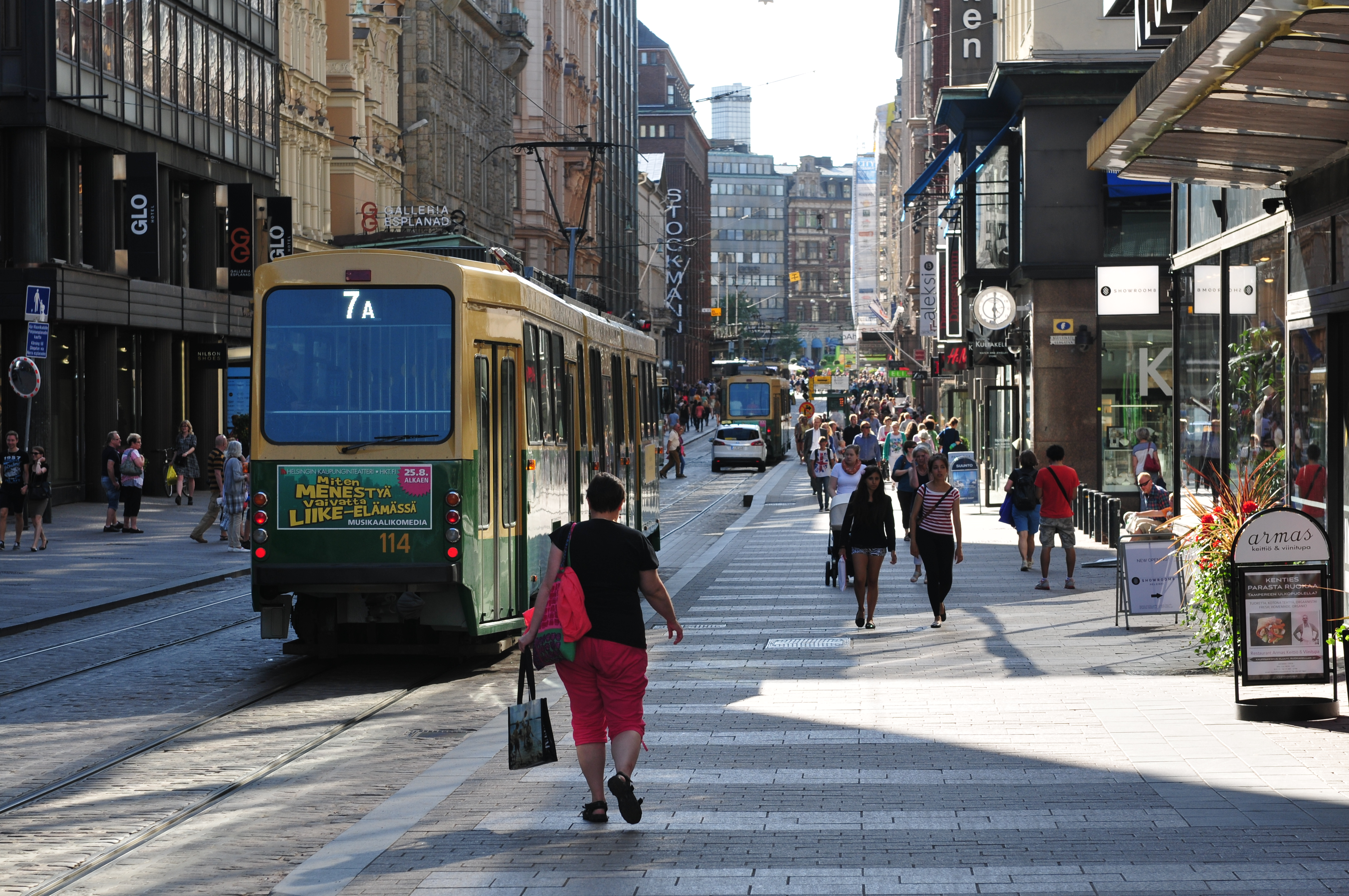
Aleksanterinkatu has intense tram traffic.

Aleksanterinkatu is Helsinki's historical main street, whose eastern part was named Suurkatu (Swedish: Storgatan, meaning "grand street") and Kuninkaankatu (Swedish: Kungsgatan, meaning "king's street") under Swedish rule) and got its current name Aleksanterinkatu in 1833 after Alexander I of Russia. At the same time the street was extended across the reclaimed Kluuvinlahti bay to the west to reach its current extent. The former shorelines of Kluuvinlahti have been marked with brass plaques across the street in the artwork Kluuvinlahden fossiilit by Tuula Närhinen.

The street used to have intense traffic. Because of this, the first traffic lights in Helsinki were installed in the corner between Aleksanterinkatu and Mikonkatu shortly before the 1952 Summer Olympics in Helsinki, on 5 October 1951. In the 1980s the western part of Aleksanterinkatu was changed to a public transport street, which is only allowed for trams, taxis and maintenance vehicles. At this point the sidewalks were considerably widened. As Mikonkatu was later changed to a pedestrian street, these first traffic lights in Helsinki were removed.

=== Pedestrian street plan ===
The architect Jorma Mänty presented his plan of converting Aleksanterinkatu into a pedestrian street at an event organised by the Helsinki society in 1967. Especially the organisation Liikennepoliittinen yhdistys Enemmistö supported converting the street into a pedestrian street. A pedestrian street experiment was held on Aleksanterinkatu from 12 June to 12 October 1970 between Mannerheimintie and Unioninkatu. The experiment was continued from 13 October 1970 to 8 January 1971 between Mannerheimintie and Fabianinkatu. During this time the street was closed for private car traffic. It was still open for maintenance and goods transport traffic and for trams.

Pedestrian access on Aleksanterinkatu was improved by moving the driveway to between the Three Smiths Statue and the Stockmann department store in 1980. Aleksanterinkatu never became a pedestrian street but its sidewalks were renovated from 1982 to 1986.

== Streets in other cities ==
Aleksanterinkatu is also the name of the main street in many other Finnish cities, e.g.: Tampere, Lahti, Oulu, Porvoo and Loviisa.

== See also ==
- Keskuskatu

== Sources ==
- Helsinki city museum FAQ page (in Finnish)
