= Stockmann, Helsinki centre =

Department store located in Helsinki

Coordinates: 60°10′06″N 024°56′32″E

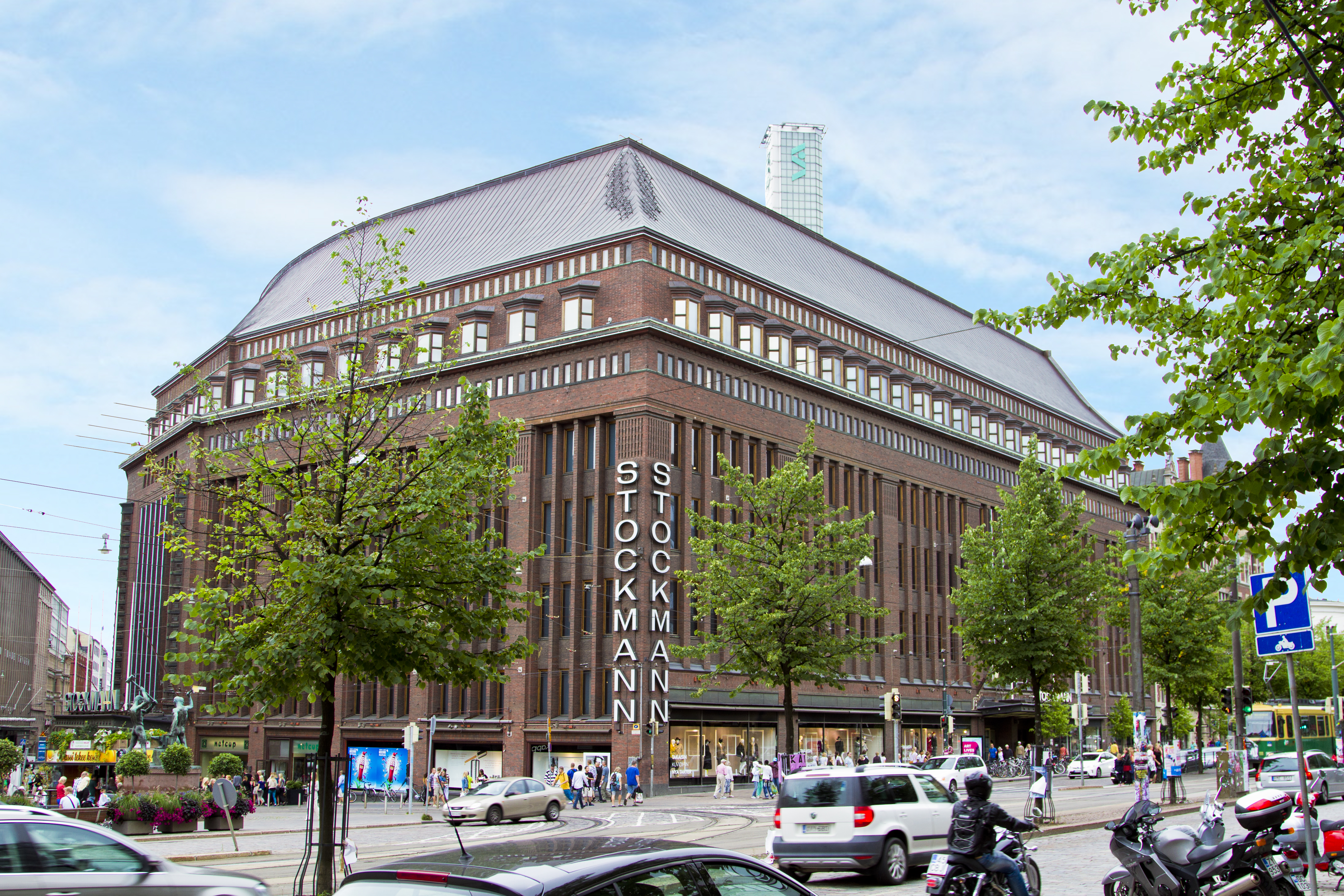
The Stockmann department store during summer 2013.

Stockmann Helsinki Centre is a culturally significant business building and department store located in the centre of Helsinki, Finland. It is one of many department stores owned by the Stockmann corporation. It is the largest department store in the Nordic countries in terms of area and total sales. The store is known for carrying all the internationally recognised luxury brands, and Stockmann's enjoys a reputation as the primary high-end department store in Finland. In 2017, Stockmann Helsinki Centre was the fifth largest department store in Europe with area of 50,500 square meters.

== History ==
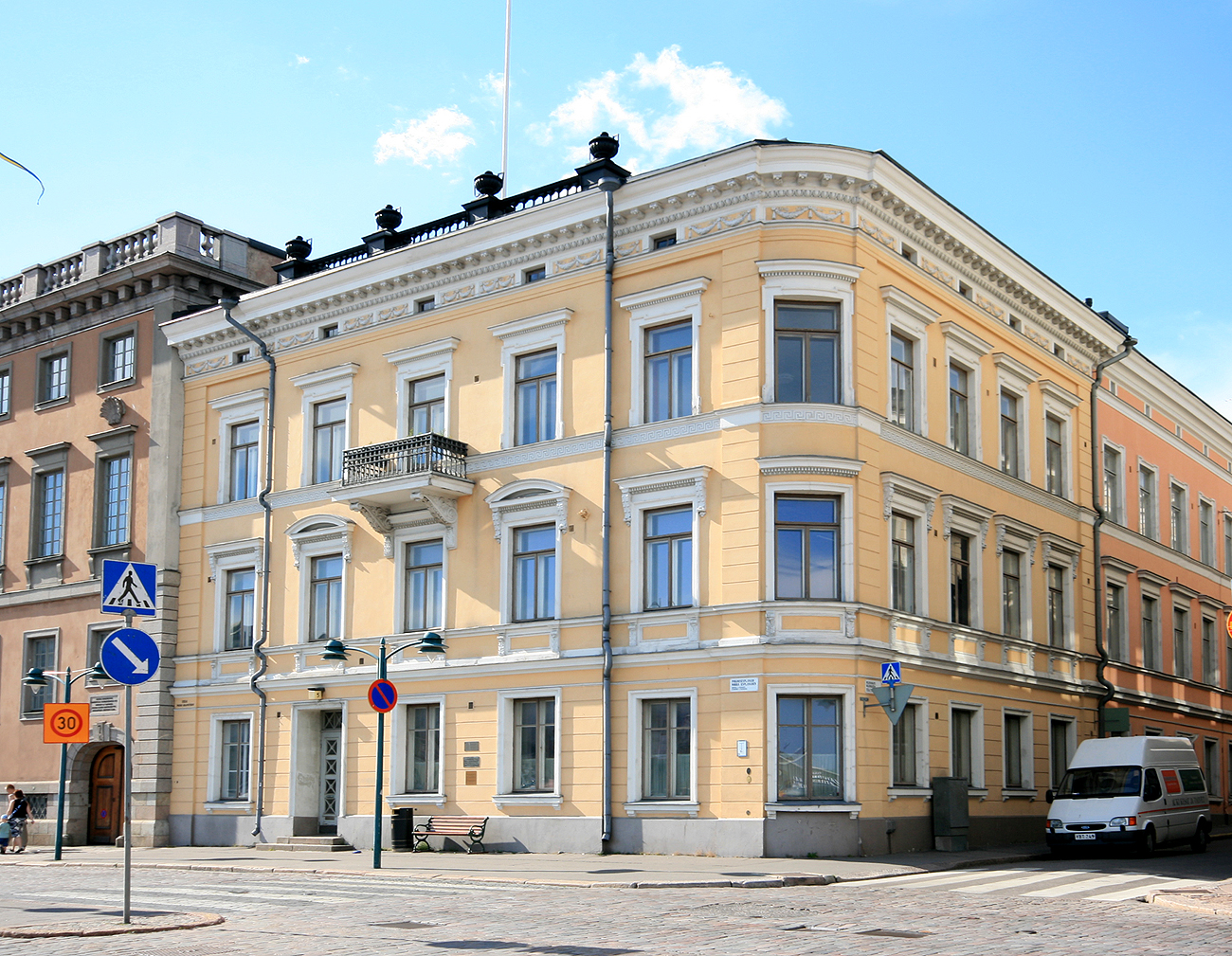
Stockmann's first location in Helsinki was at Pohjoisesplanadi 5.

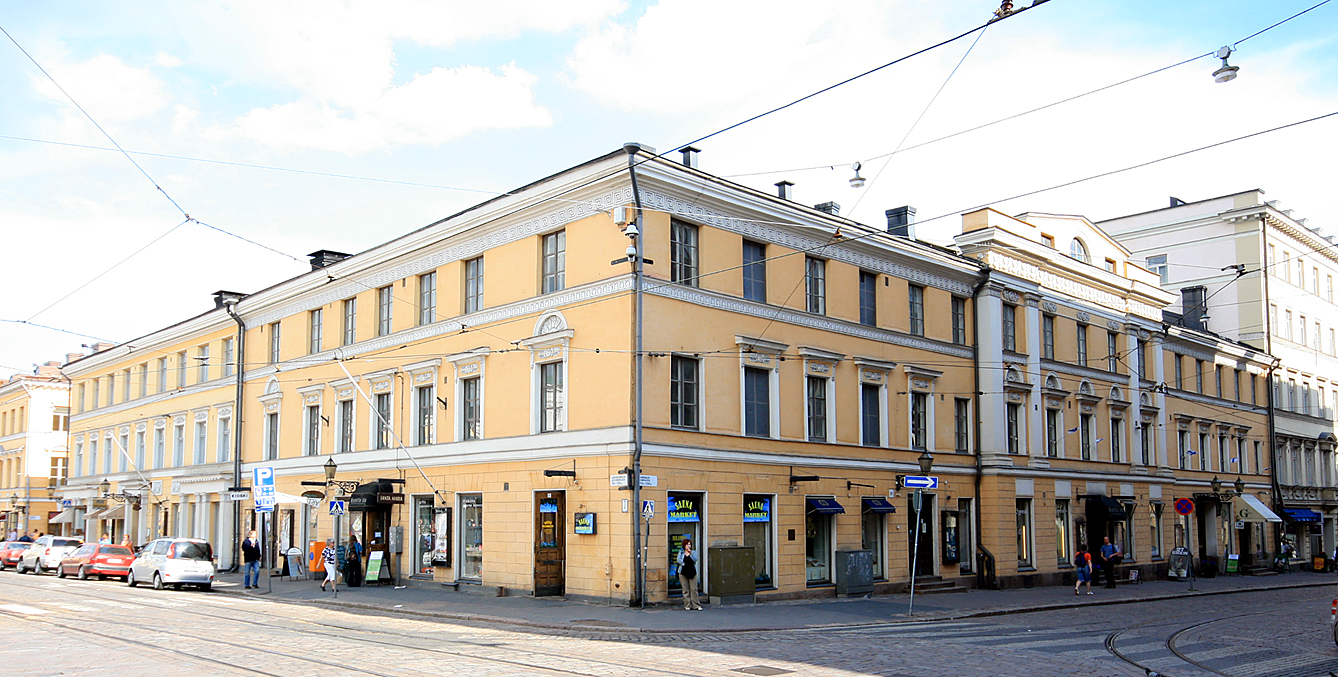
The second location of Stockmann was at Aleksanterinkatu 28 in Helsinki.

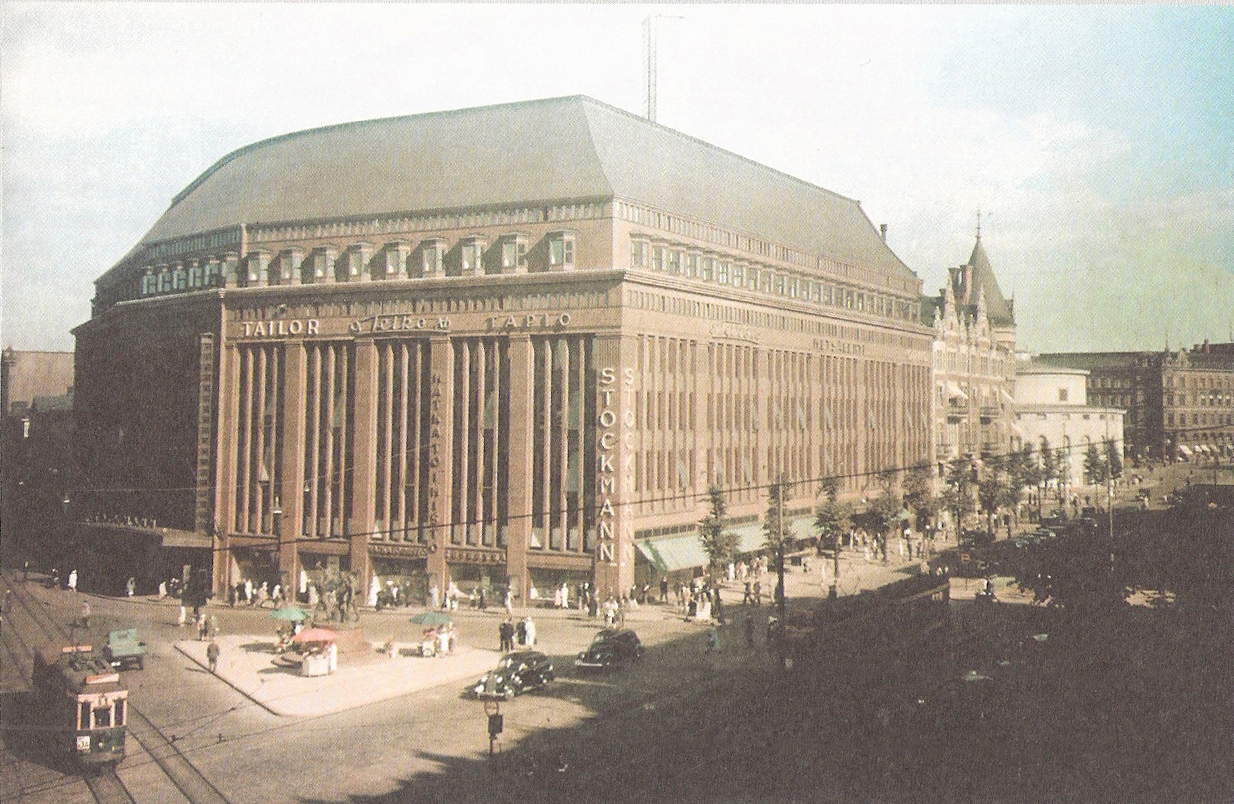
Stockmann in the 1930s at Aleksanterinkatu 52.

The Stockmann department store in Helsinki was founded in 1862 by Heinrich Georg Franz Stockmann.

The first department store was located next to the Market Square at Pohjoisesplanadi 5. This first department store was a general goods shop.

In 1930, when the department store was opened, it was a modern and impressive commercial palace that symbolized European urban life.

Especially the clock at the main entrance, colloquially "Stockan kello" ("Stocka's clock"), has become a symbol of Helsinkian city culture as a popular meeting place.

The Stockmann logo is the letter S in the form of a set of their escalators, which are commonly, but wrongly believed to be the first escalators in Finland. The first escalators in Finland were installed at the Forum department store in Turku in 1926.

== Renovations and Expansions ==
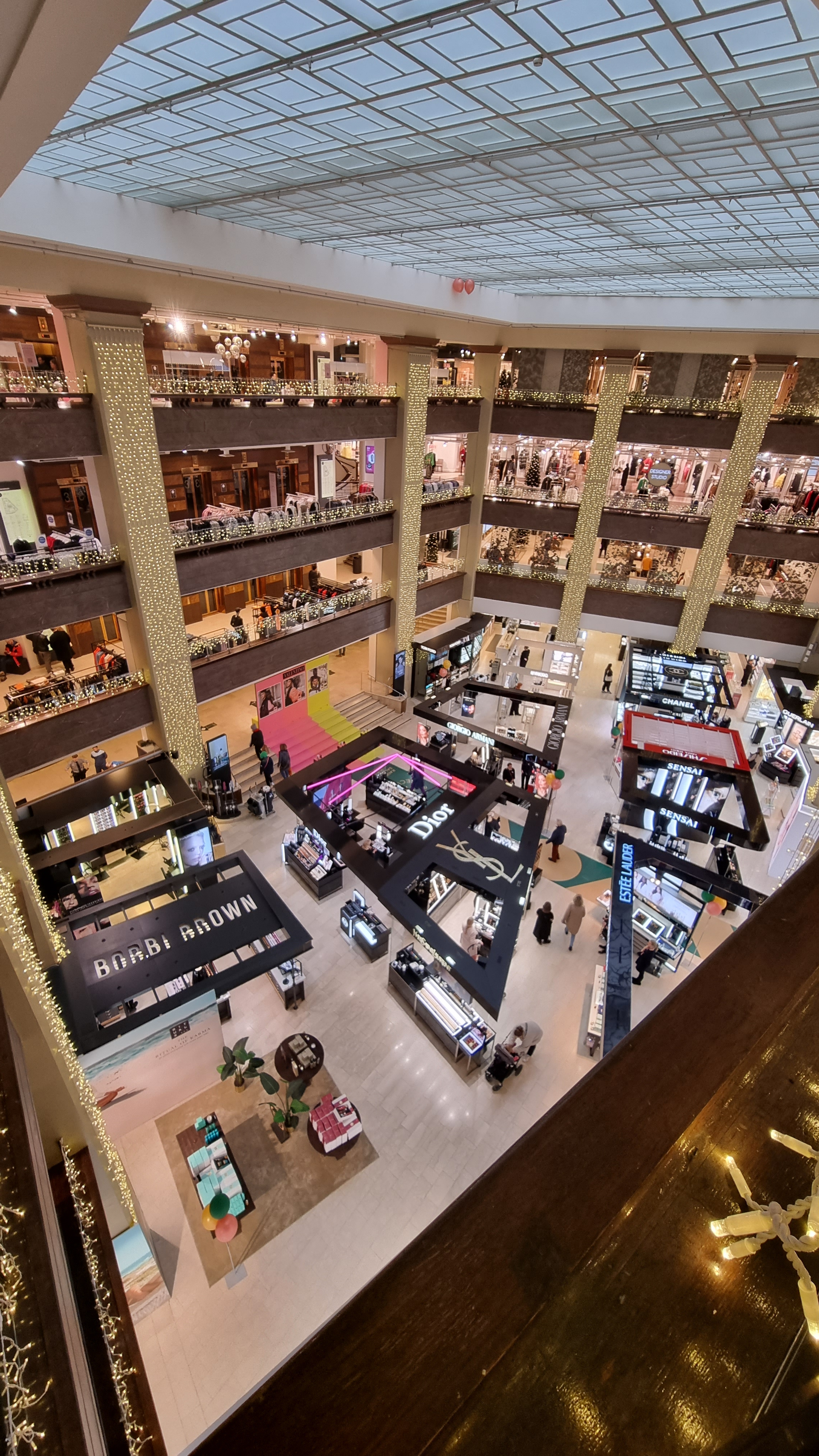
Stockmann's atrium.

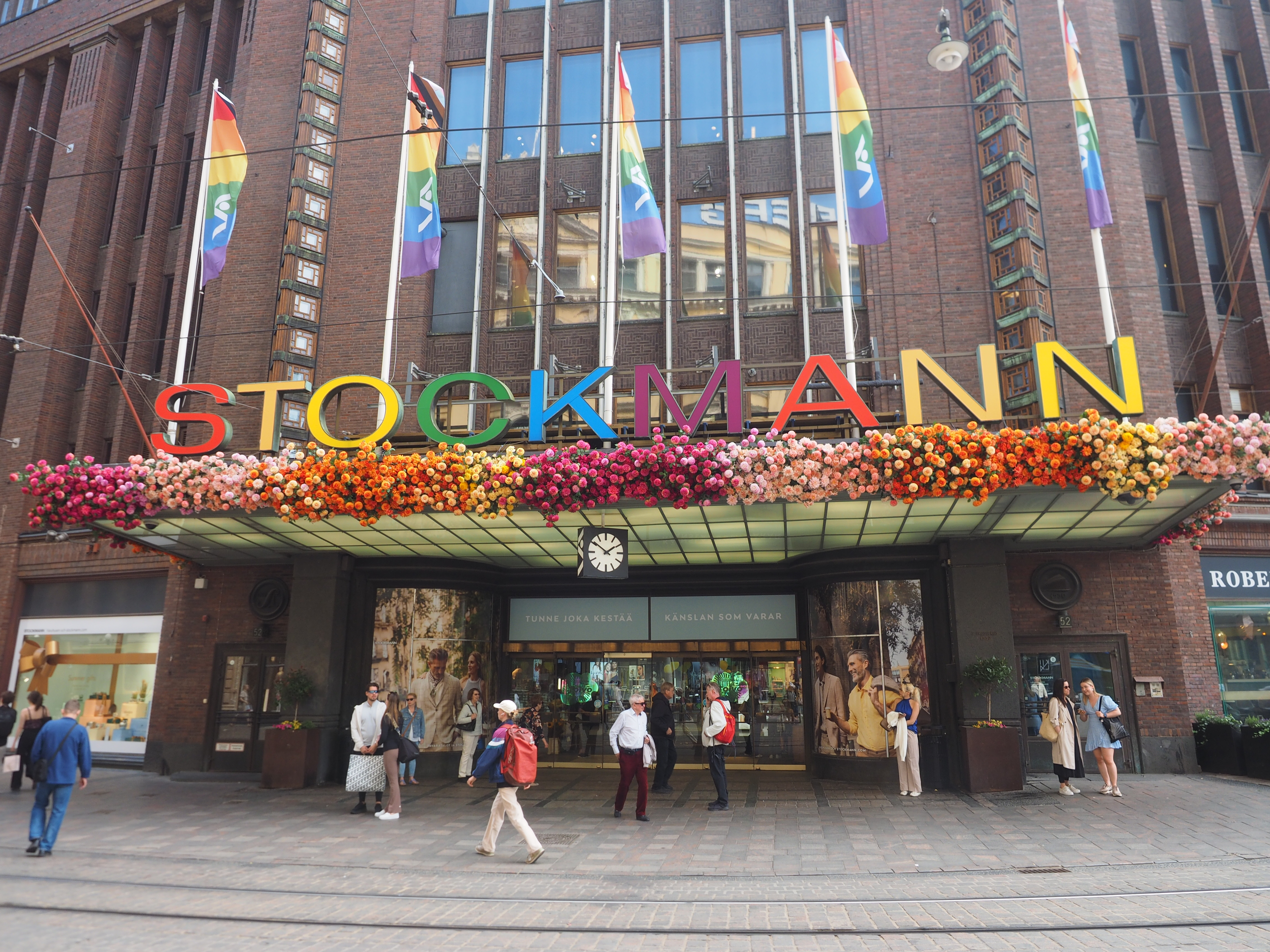
The main entrance during Pride Month.

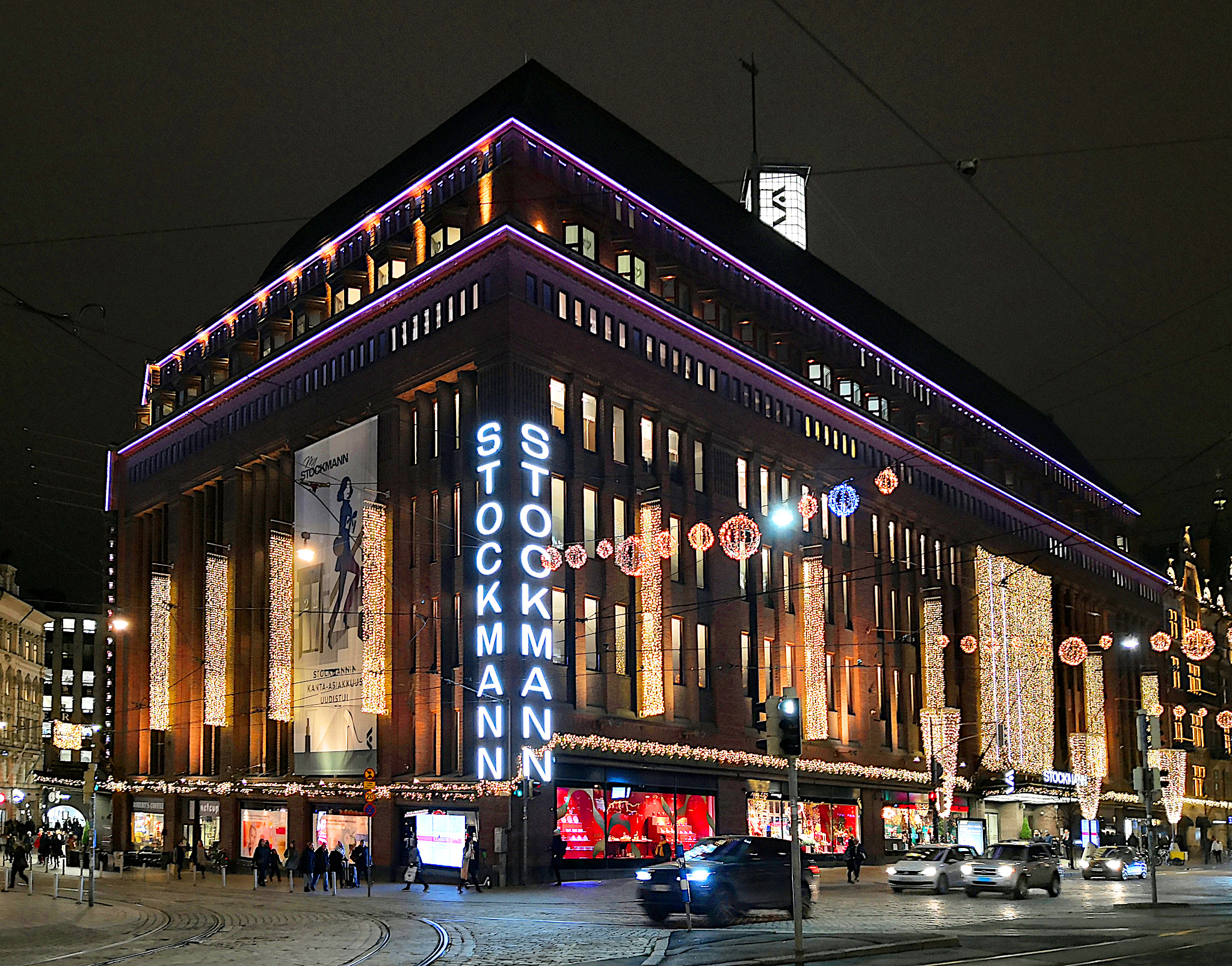
A view of the department store from across Mannerheimintie.

In 1989, the Argos House, located in the same block, was incorporated into the Stockmann building. During the renovation, only the façade of the Argos House was preserved. As a result, Stockmann expanded to fill the entire block bordered by Mannerheimintie, Aleksanterinkatu, Keskuskatu, and Pohjoisesplanadi streets. The department store has seven floors, excluding the basement and the eighth floor, which houses other businesses.

A further expansion of the department store began in 2007. The project, titled Kaikkien aikojen Stockmann – Alla tiders Stockmann (“Stockmann of All Time”), was completed in 2010, increasing the retail area by 10,000 square metres (110,000 sq ft) to a total of 50,000 square metres (540,000 sq ft). This was a particularly challenging undertaking, as it took place in the heart of Helsinki while the department store remained fully operational throughout the construction.

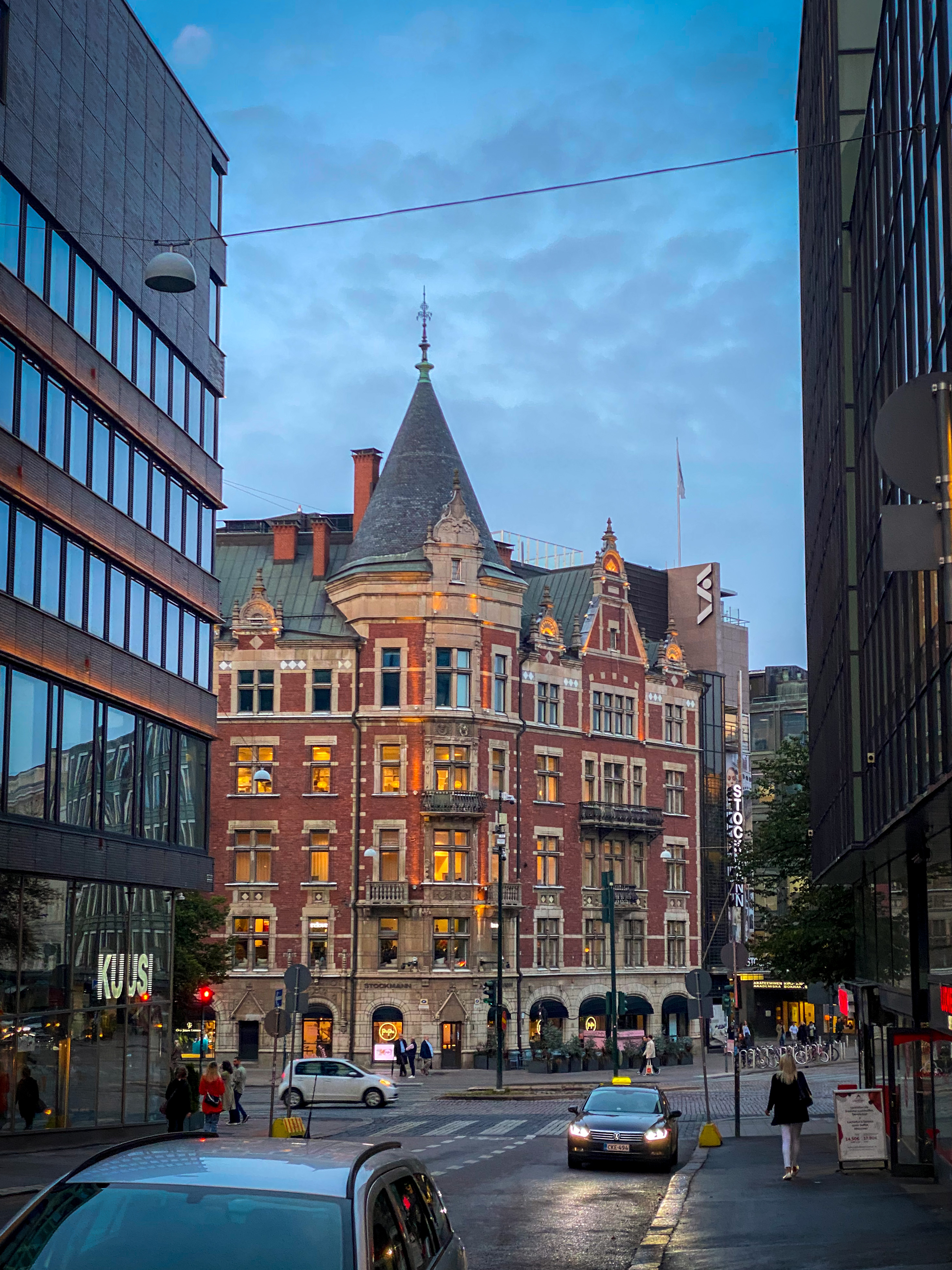
The Argos corner of the department store.

The department store was expanded both underground and in its central area. The atrium was enclosed, adding 1,500 square metres (16,000 sq ft) of retail space across the sixth to eighth floors. On the eighth and topmost floor, a food court was added, offering seating for 950 customers and views overlooking the lower floors.

In total, 200,000 cubic metres (7,100,000 cu ft) of rock were excavated from underground. At its deepest point, the digging reached a depth of 30 metres (98 ft).

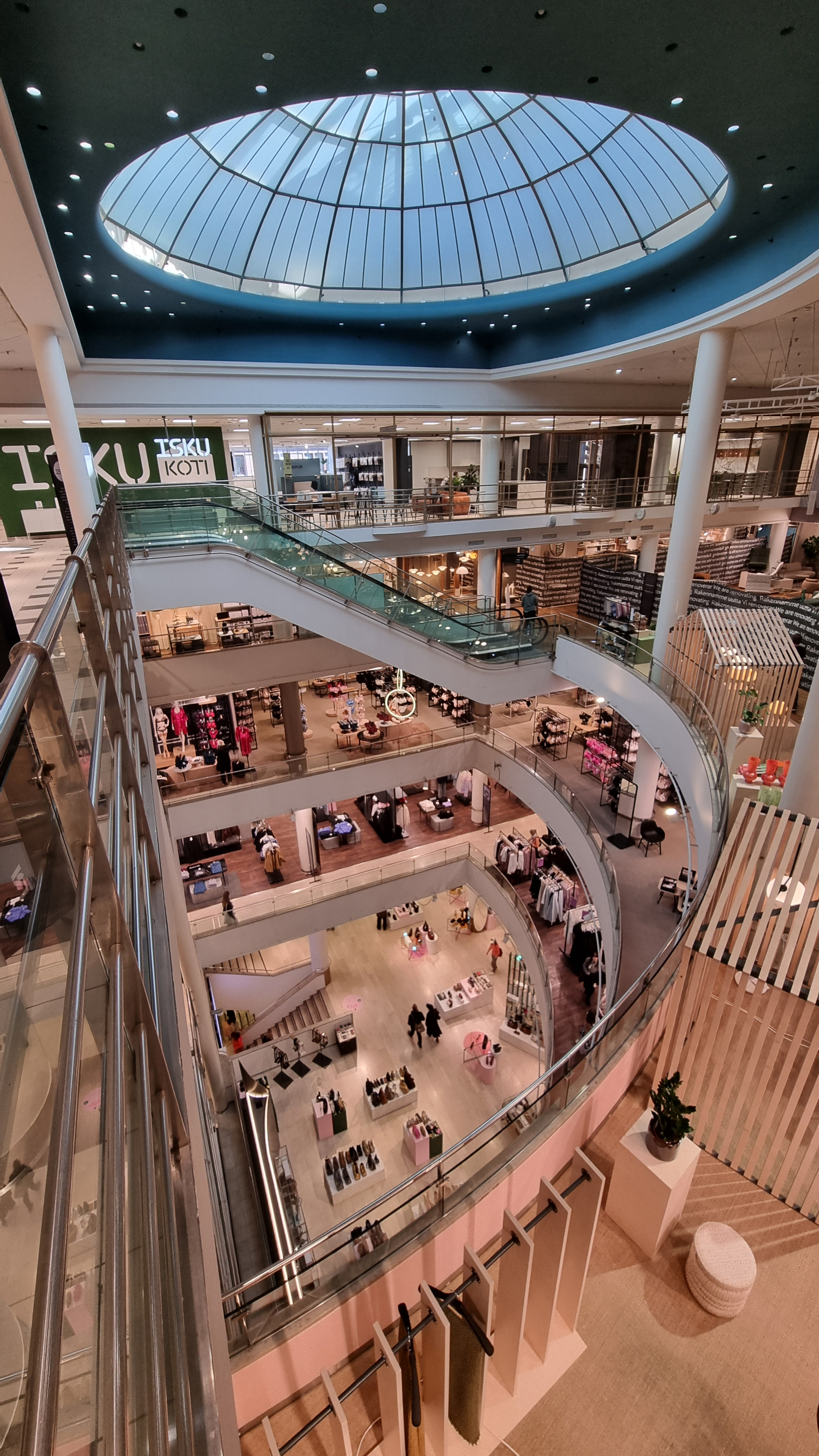
Stockmann's Argos atrium in August 2025.

The new garage tripled the parking capacity to 600 vehicles. The three-story facility is connected to Ruoholahdenkatu via the central maintenance tunnel, and to the junction of Kalevankatu and Mannerheimintie.

The size of the grocery department was doubled to approximately 5,000 square metres.

The total capital expenditure for the enlargement phase of the project was €198 million, in addition to significant repair and renovation work on the existing premises. The expansion was projected to increase annual sales by €50 million.

== See also ==
- Kämp Galleria
- Forum shopping centre
