= Tehtaankatu =

Street in Helsinki, Finland

Coordinates: 60.1583°N 24.9470°E

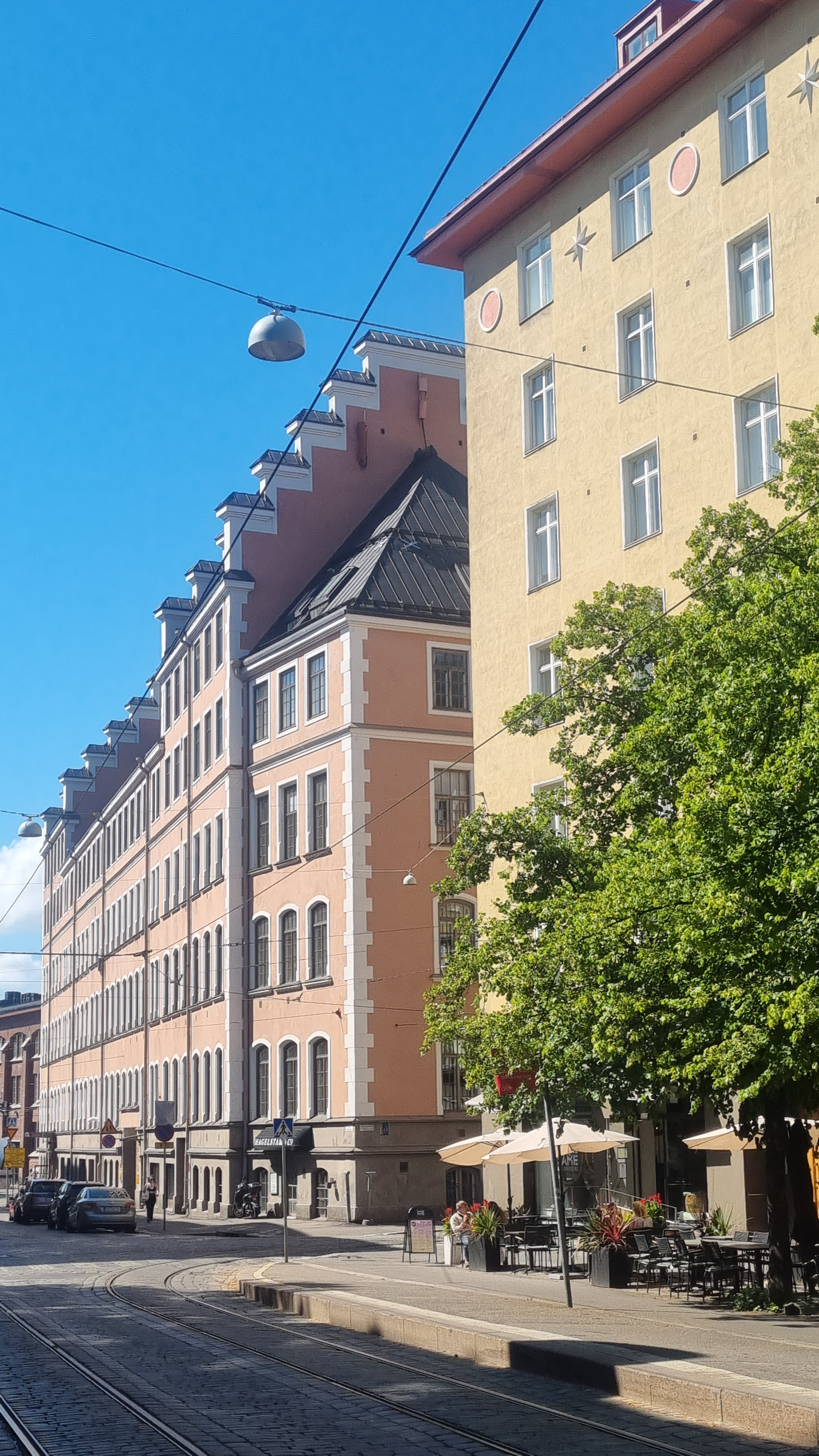
A view of Tehtaankatu

Tehtaankatu (Swedish: Fabriksgatan) is an east-to-west street in southern central Helsinki. It leads from the border of Kaivopuisto park near South Harbour to Hietalahti shipyard. Most of the street is in Ullanlinna district, but its westernmost part forms the border between Eira and Punavuori districts.

Since the end of the Second World War, the Soviet and later Russian embassy has been located on Tehtaankatu, and the name of the street has been commonly used as shorthand for Russian influence in Finland, especially during the Soviet era.

Both the Finnish name Tehtaankatu and the Swedish name Fabriksgatan mean "Factory Street". The names were given to the street in 1887, because at that time an industrial zone was planned at the area which is now Eira. That plan was soon abandoned, but the name has remained.

The English translation is the title and inspiration behind the song "Factory Street Bells" by the The Swell Season, written by Glen Hansard while he was living on Tehtaankatu.

== Major buildings ==
From east to west:

- St. Henry's Cathedral, a Catholic Cathedral (homepage)
- Russian Embassy (homepage).
- Eira Hospital, a private hospital (homepage)
- Agricola Church, a Lutheran church (homepage). Designed by Lars Sonck in 1925.
- Villa Hjelt, a residence of the Italian ambassador to Finland. Designed by Gustaf Estlander in 1912.
