= Villa Hjelt =

Historically building in Helsinki, Finland

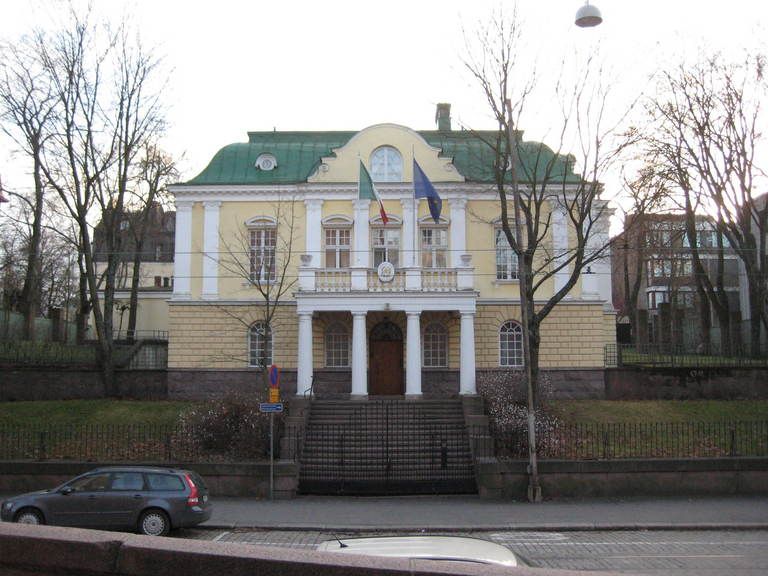
- Villa Hjelt in 2009
- Interactive map of the Villa Hjelt area

General information
- Type: Villa
- Location: Tehtaankatu 32 C, 00150 Helsinki, Helsinki, Finland
- Coordinates: 60.157702°N 24.938709°E
- Current tenants: Italian ambassador to Finland (since 1925)
- Completed: 1912; 114 years ago

Design and construction
- Architect: Gustaf Estlander

Villa Hjelt is a villa located on the Tehtaankatu street opposite Mikael Agricola Church in the Eira district in Helsinki, Finland. The building, completed in 1912, was designed by architect Gustaf Estlander (1876–1930).

== History ==
The building was commissioned by Dr. E. Roos, who, however, died soon after the building was completed. At that time, the building was bought by businessman Allan Hjelt (1885–1940), who carried out alterations designed by architect Eliel Saarinen to the building, including the main staircase and living spaces.

Hjelt presented villa in the 1910s as the residence of Prince Frederick Charles of Hesse, who was chosen as the King of Finland, and the current Presidential Palace would have remained for the use of the court. However, the Kingdom of Finland project never came to fruition, and in the 1920s Allan Hjelt ran into financial difficulties. He sold the villa in 1925 to Italy, and the Italian ambassador to Finland has lived in the building since then.
