= VIII District, Turku =

City district in Turku, Finland

Coordinates: 60°26′45″N 22°14′40″E

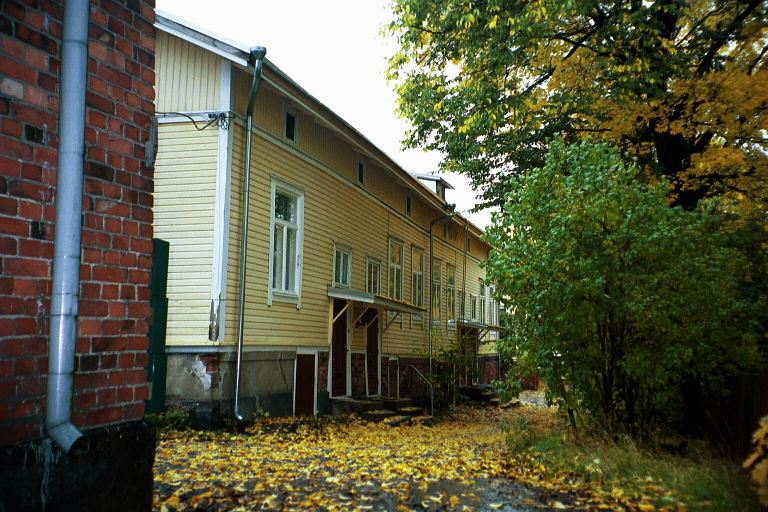
Typical housing in Port Arthur.

The VIII District, also known as Port Arthur (or Portsa in colloquial Finnish), is one of the central districts of Turku, Finland. It is located on the west side of the river Aura, between Puistokatu and the IX District (Länsiranta). The district consists mostly of wooden houses, separated by narrow streets paved with cobblestones. It is widely considered one of the most beautiful residential districts in the whole of Finland, and has received an award to that effect in 2001. Port Arthur is one of the most expensive districts in Turku to live in.

The district was originally built in the 1900s as a residential area for workers. It was inadvertently named after the city of Port Arthur (now Lüshunkou, China) that Imperial Russia (which ruled Finland at the time) lost during the Russo-Japanese War in 1904. Local children asked the workmen what they were doing; their reply of "rebuilding Port Arthur" caught on among the citizenry.

Attempts by the city council to build tenements in the area in the 1970s failed due to strong opposition from locals. The area is nowadays protected.

In addition to the residential area of Port Arthur, the district contains the Michael's Church, and the Kakola hill.

The district has a population of 4,760 (as of 2004) and an annual population growth rate of -1.55%. 9.26% of the district's population are under 15 years old, while 19.10% are over 65. The district's linguistic makeup is 91.07% Finnish, 7.06% Swedish, and 1.87% other.

== See also ==
- Districts of Turku
- Districts of Turku by population
