= St Michael's Church, Turku =

Michael's Church
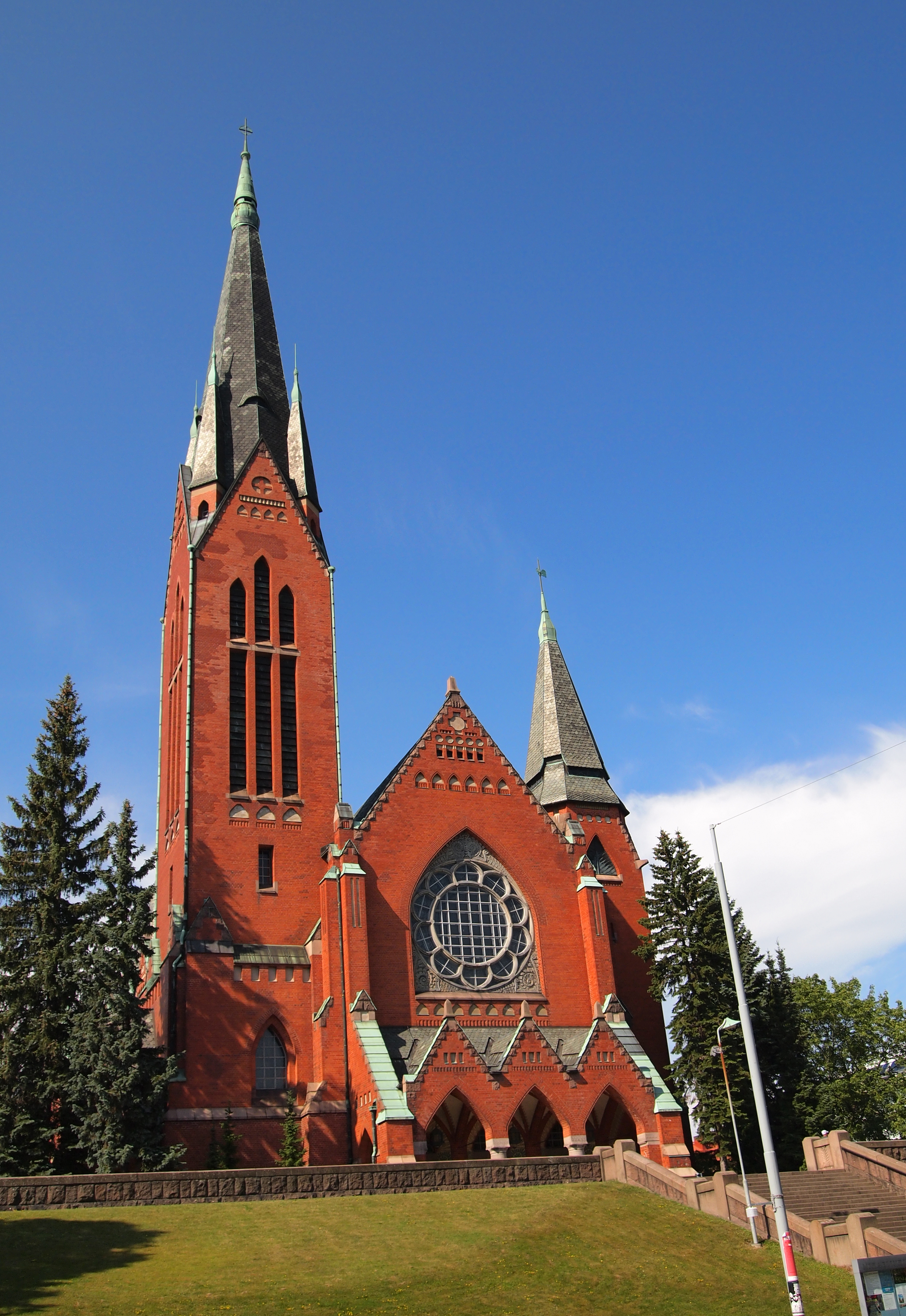
- Michael's Church
- 60°26′55″N 022°14′53″E
- Location: Turku
- Country: Finland
- Denomination: Evangelical Lutheran Church of Finland
- Website: Official website (in Finnish)

History
- Status: Completed

Architecture
- Architect: Lars Sonck
- Architectural type: Art Nouveau and Gothic Revival
- Completed: 1905

Specifications
- Capacity: 1,800
- Height: 77 m

Michael's Church (Finnish: Mikaelinkirkko, Swedish: Mikaelskyrkan) is a church situated in central Turku. It is named after Archangel Michael and was finished in 1905. It dominates the western skyline of the city of Turku. It was designed by Professor Lars Sonck and is one of the most popular wedding churches in Turku, being able to seat 1,800 people. When Sonck won the competition for the church in 1894, he was only a 23-year-old architectural student. Michael's Church is older than Michael's parish. The parish only dates back to 1921.

== Architecture ==
Michael's church is a distinguished example of the neogothic style in architecture. It is a long church with three aisles, galleries and a multifaceted choir. In addition to the main entrance there are also doors at each corner of the church. The sacristy is situated behind the choir. The main spire rises to a height of 77 meters from the foundations.

The main building material of the walls of the church is red brick. The roof is made of grey green slate from Norway. However, the majority of the material used in the construction of the church are native materials from Finland. For the foundations, the stone steps, and the walls, natural stone was quarried not far from Turku.

Even before the construction work started, Sonck wanted to make considerable changes to his winning design, but the church council did not agree to the proposed changes and in the end only minor detail changes were made to the facade. As for the interior, however, Sonck got a much freer hand to make changes from his original drawings. This is clearly seen in the deviations from the style of the times: Jugend follows Gothic and Romantic Nationalism.

== Interior design ==
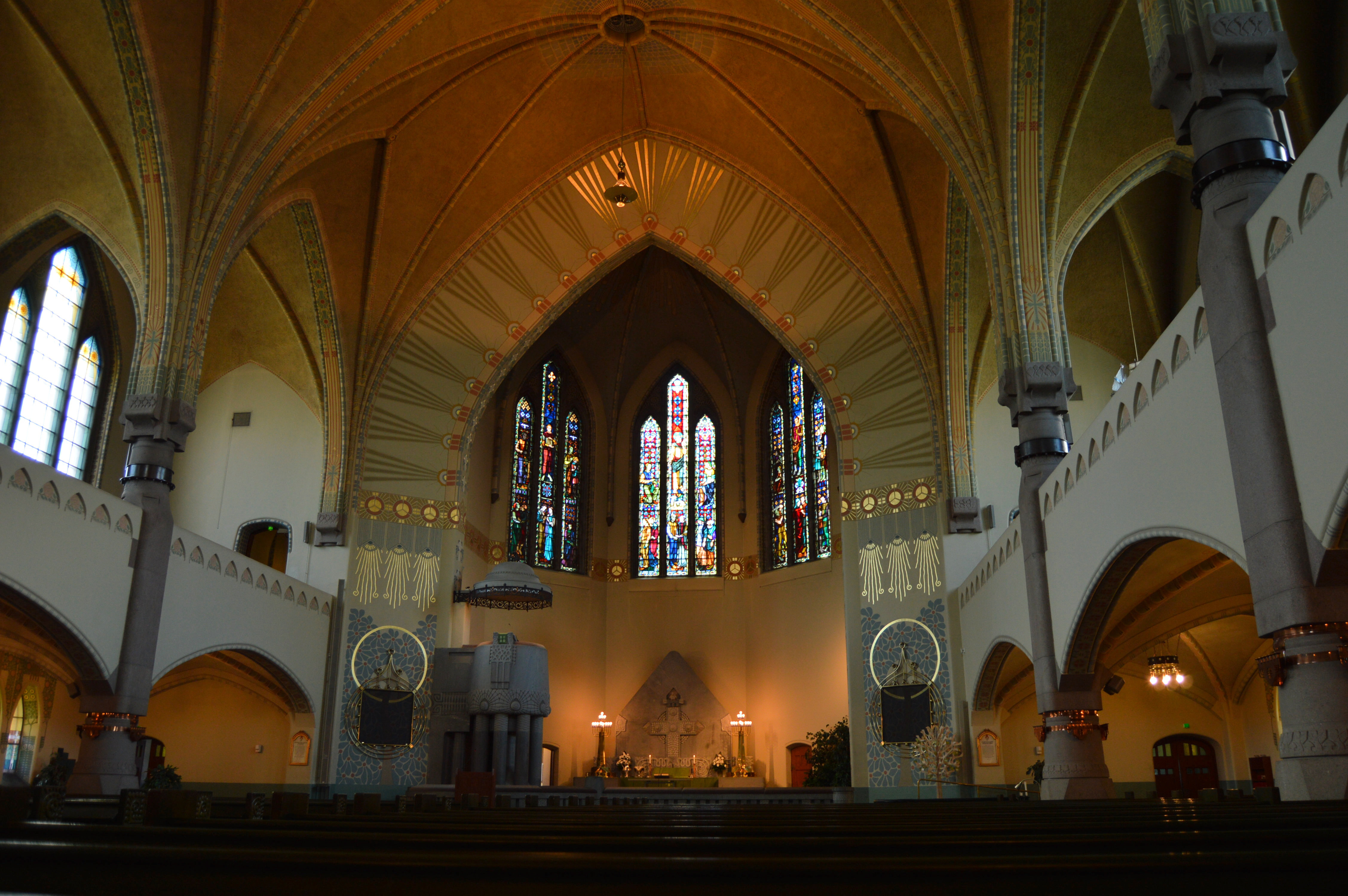
Interior of St. Michael's Church

Max Frelander the architect, who worked as an assistant to Sonck, has contributed to the interior design. A rich Jugend ornamentation decorates both the interior, the staircases and the windows. The altar, the pulpit, the altar rail, and the window frame are all made of Finnish soapstone. The central motif of the altar is a cross, on which base there is a symmetrical carving of two serpents. Also on the corner level of the altar rail there are rings of twisting serpents. The top of the cross is ornamented with a dove, the symbol of the Holy Spirit. The Jugend windows of the choir, which depict Finnish pine, were destroyed in a bombing raid during the Finnish Winter War (1939–1940). The national romantic movement is particularly dominant in the design of the choir. Motifs from Finnish nature are associated with traditional Christian symbolism.

The original window paintings, which were destroyed during the Winter War, were by the artist Willy Baer. The new ones were obtained in 1953. These were designed and done by the artists Hilkka Toivola and Otso Karpakka. The principal subjects of these works of art that were made in the Paris glass painting studio of Jean and Pierre Gaudin, are "the Good Shepherd" and "Faith, Hope, and Charity". Along with the new windows the stylistic unity of the interior of the church disappeared. Consequently, in the 1950s other changes were made in the interior design of the church to match the Gothic exterior. First the decorative paintings of the choir and the arch of triumph were painted over, and later the wall paintings in the body of the church and the staircases. However, the original decorative pictures were restored in connection with the general repair work on the church that was carried out in 1964–65.

Michael's Church underwent a thorough renovation in the 1980s. First, an exterior repair work was carried out in 1984–85. The decayed exterior brick work and the roof were completely rebuilt. Reconditioning of the interior was done in 1985–87. First the sacristy of the church was returned to its original condition. After this came the main body of the church and the staircase. The ceiling and the interior wall surfaces were carefully cleaned of the grime of decades. The decorative designs were repaired and returned to their original paint finish or painted afresh. Floors were resurfaced with a new limestone finish. The acoustics of the church, which had proved a problem, was improved. In connection with this renovation work, a basic restoration of the 48 stop mechanical organ made in Kangasala in 1965 was also done. In 2002 the new organ with 52 stops and 3633 pipes was built by the Swedish organ builders Grönlunds Orgelbyggeri AB.

The church bells have rung out from the main spire since 1931, and they were a gift from Edla and Hjalmar Aarnio. Reino Lehto made a gift to the church of the model ship hanging from the gallery. Kaarina Lehmussaari, lecturer in textiles, donated a new decorated altar cloth.

== Gallery ==
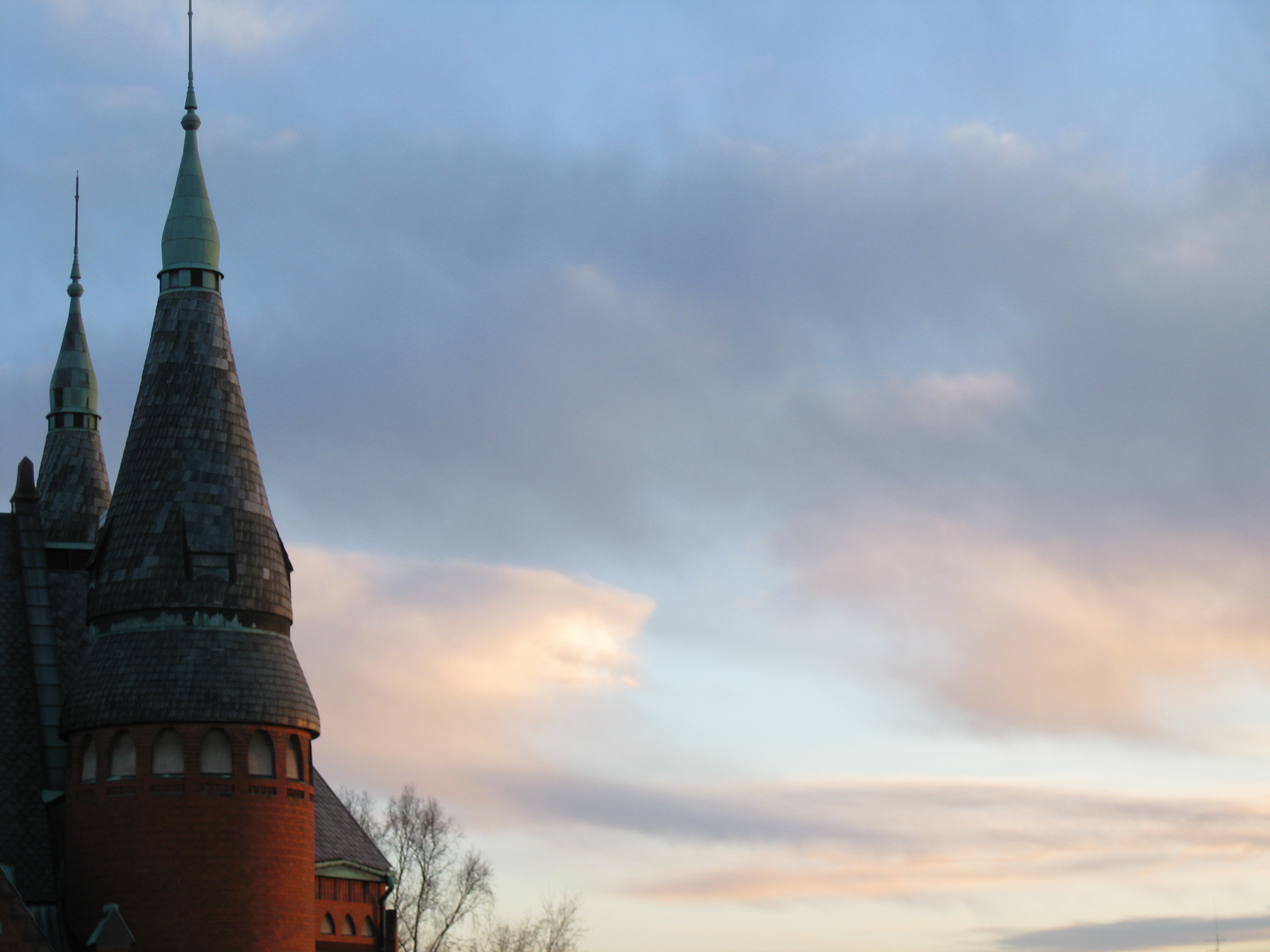

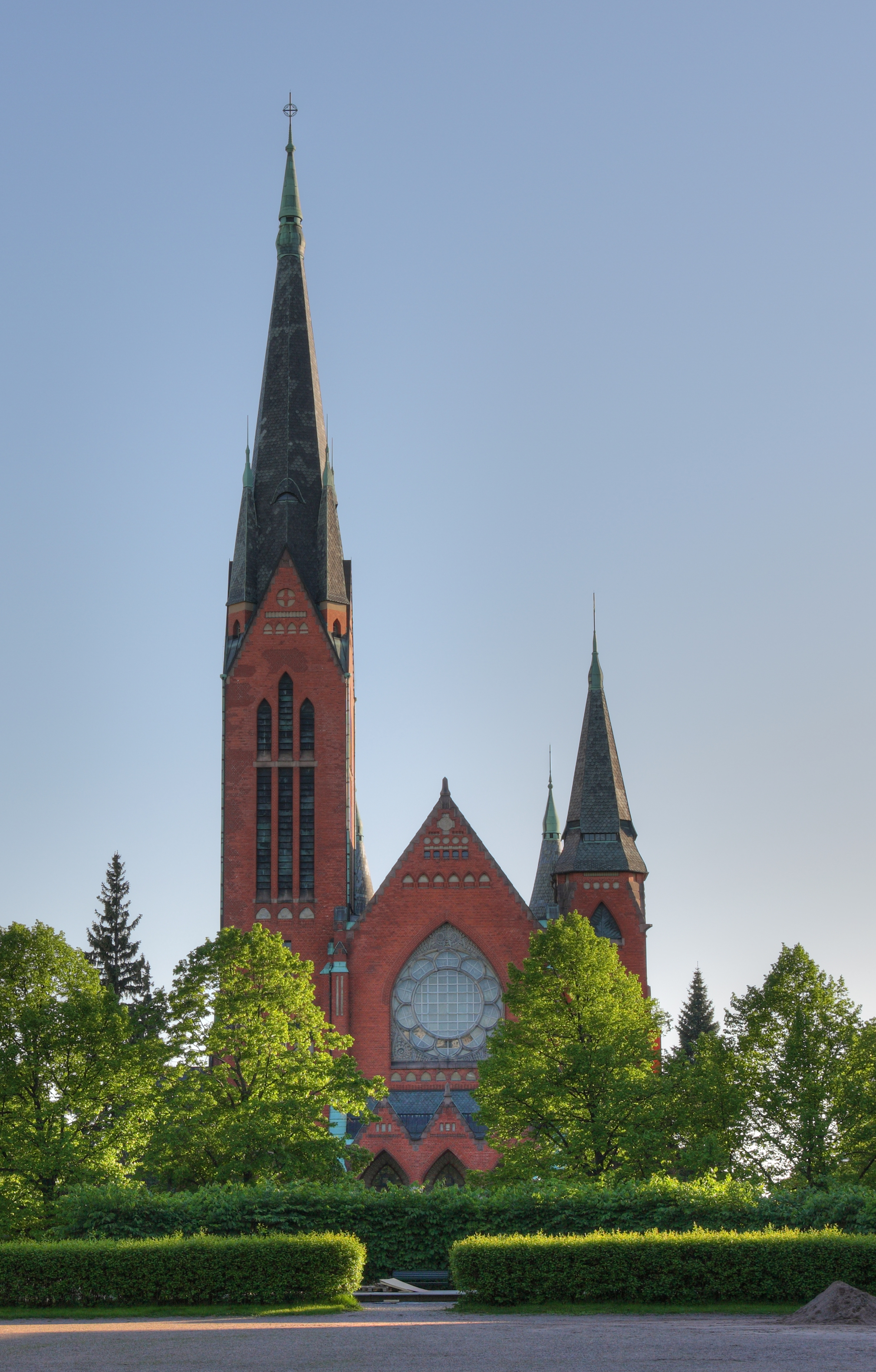

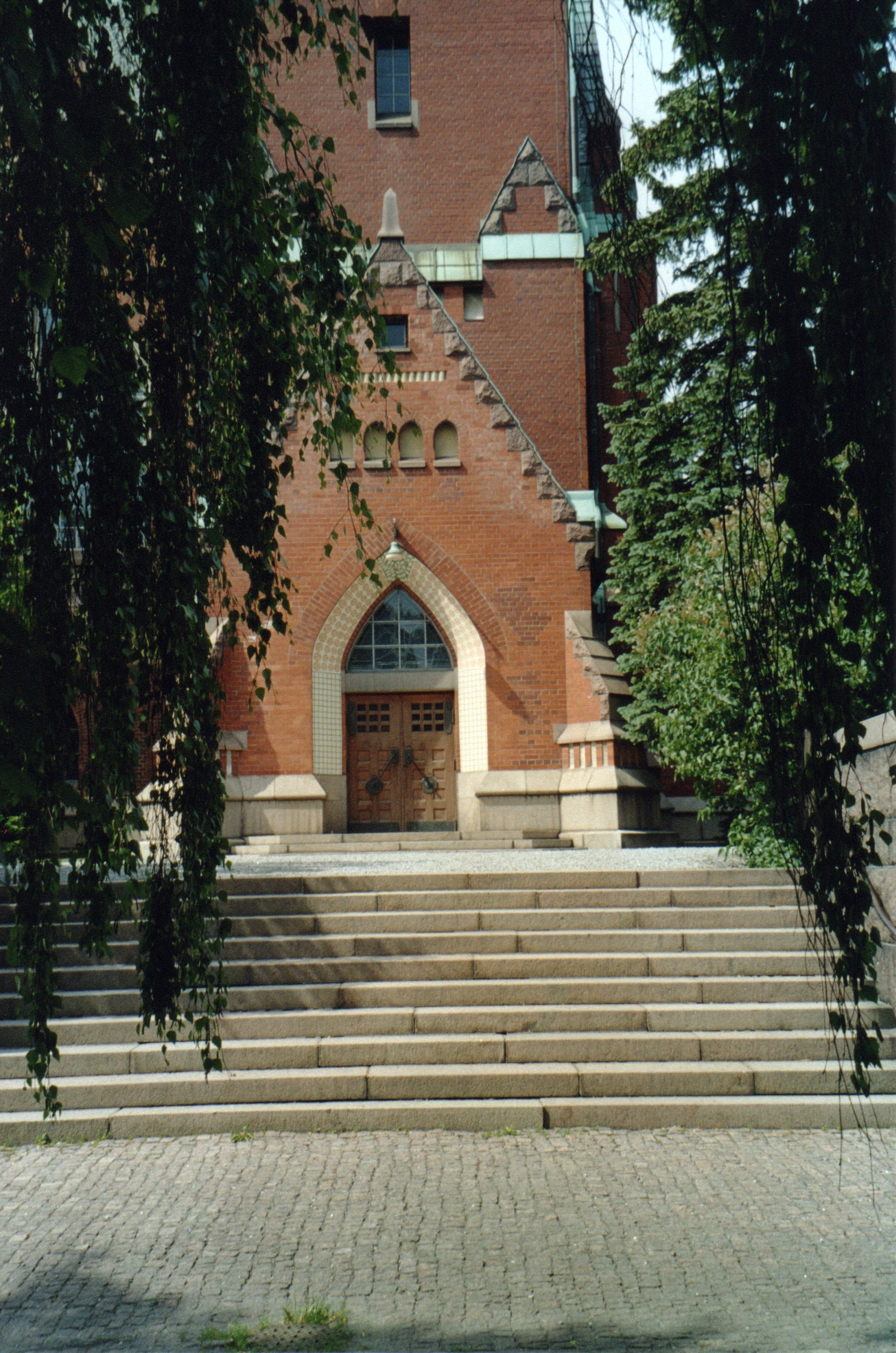

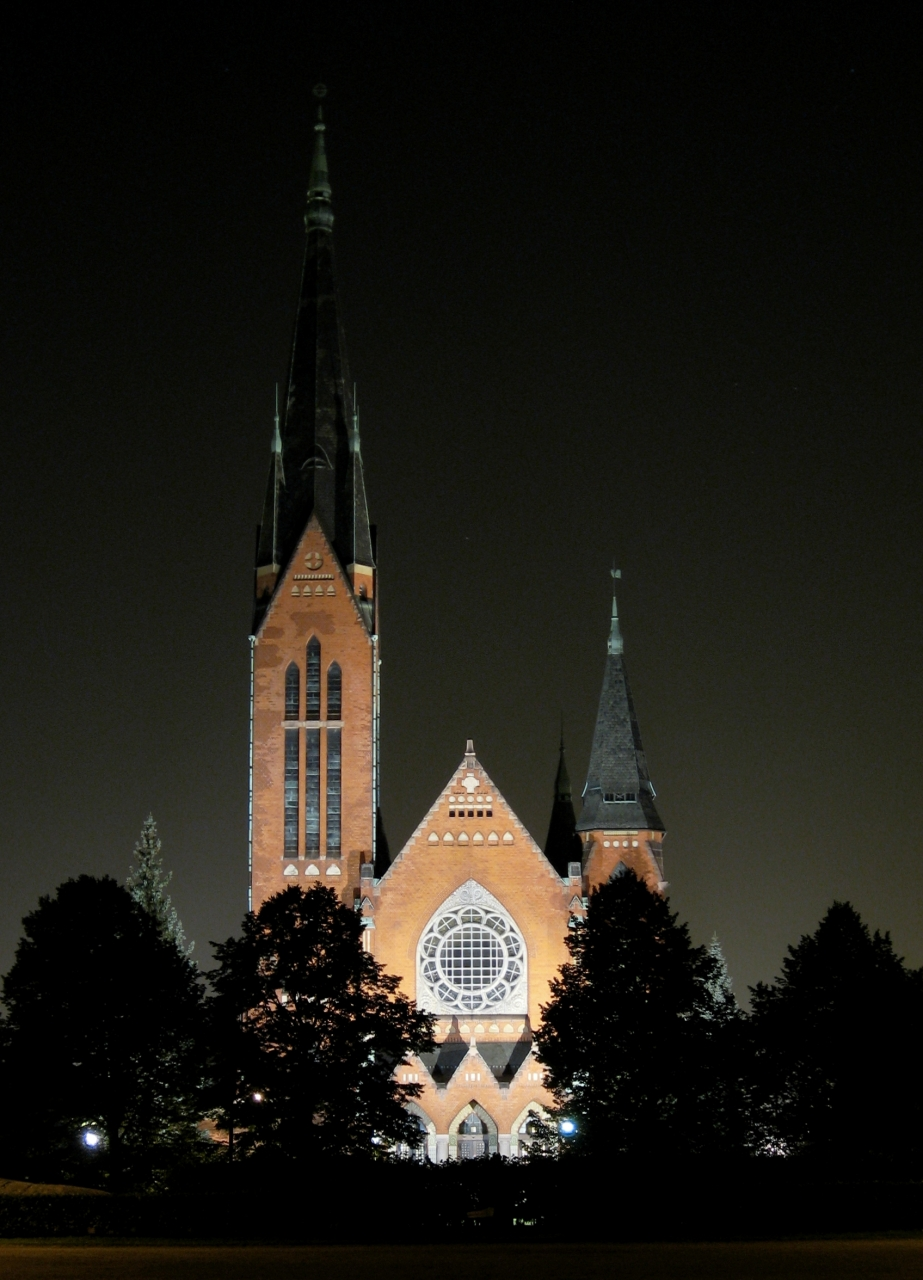

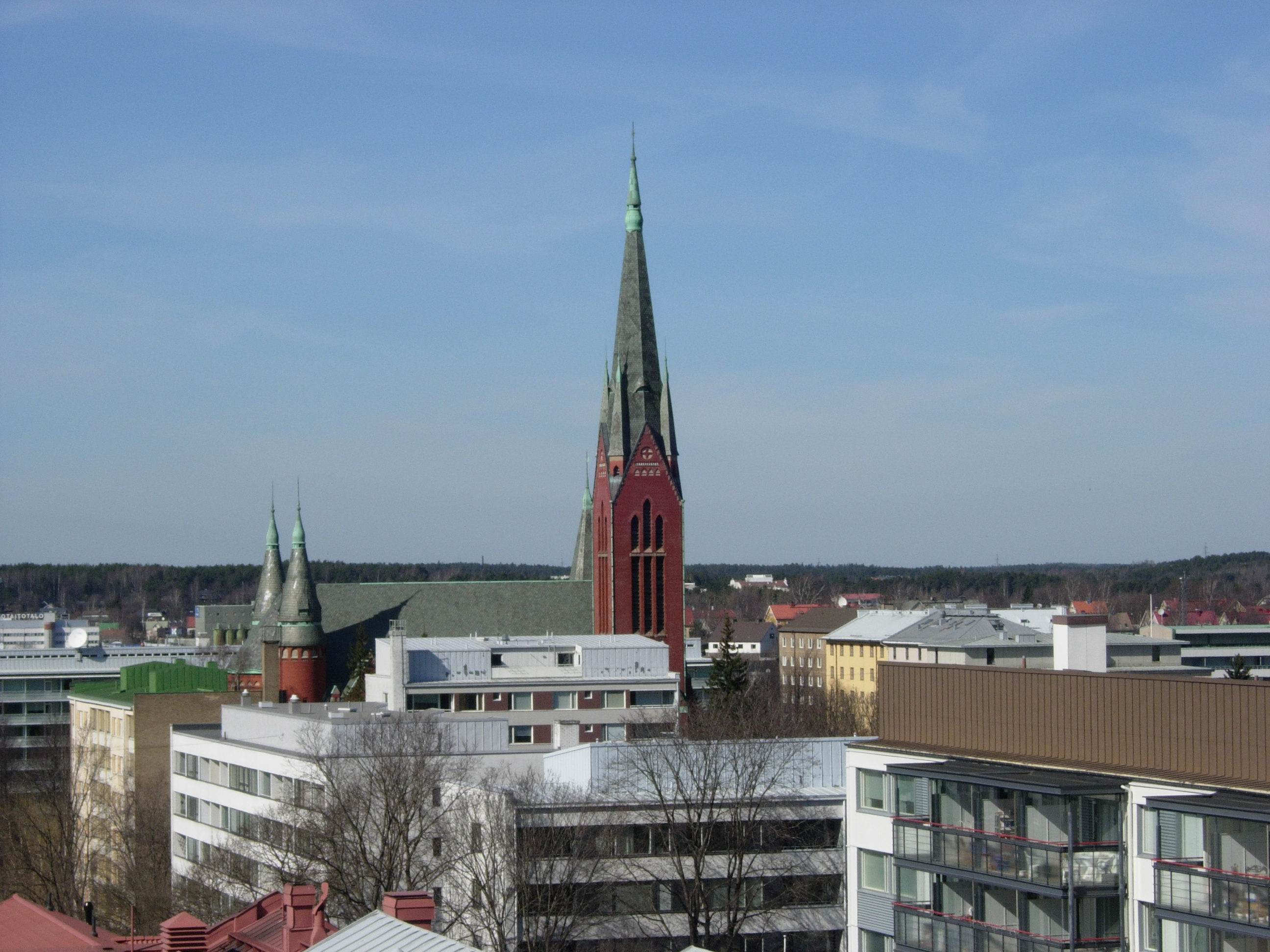

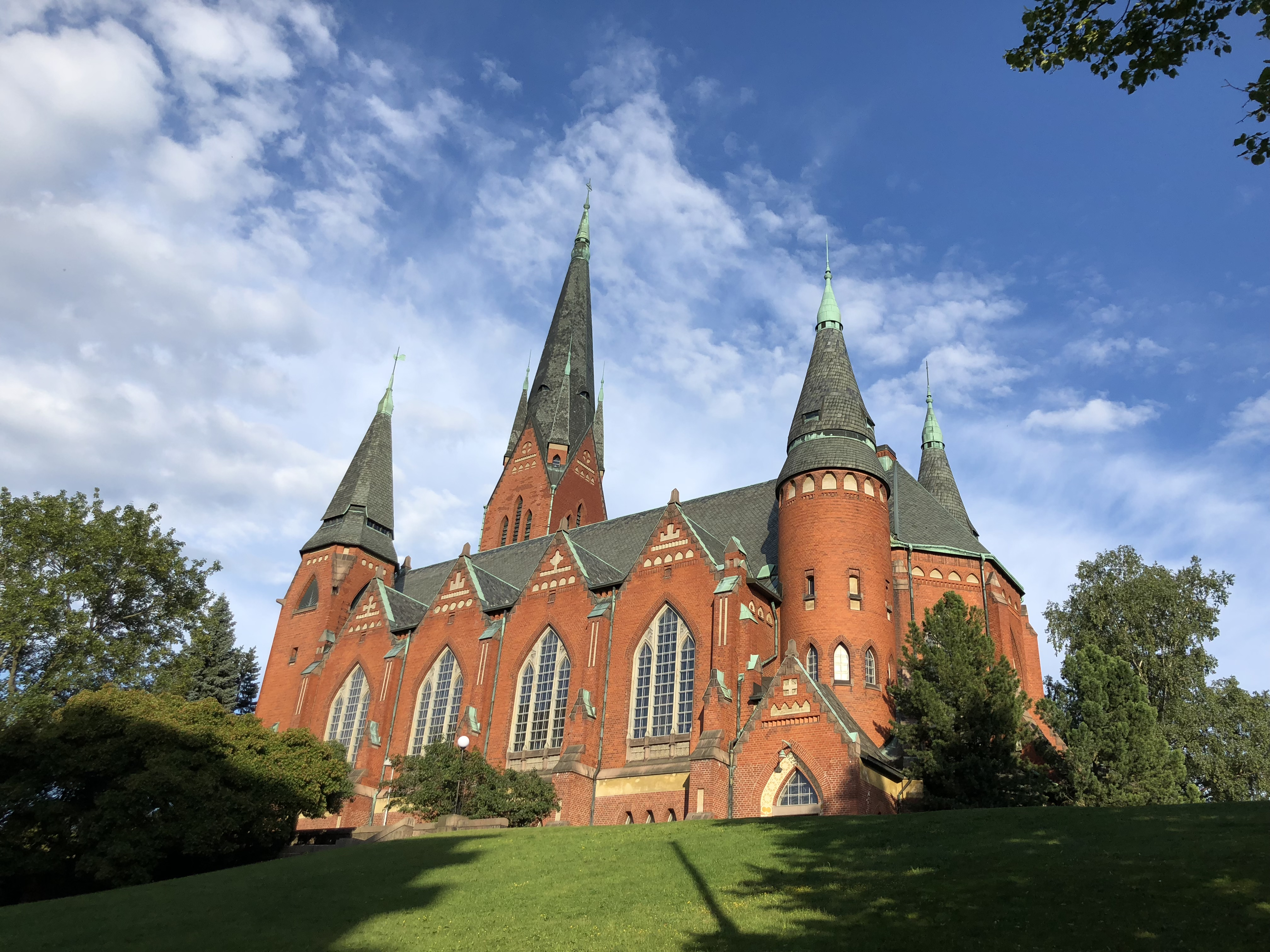

== See also ==
- Turku
- Evangelical Lutheran Church of Finland
- Turku Cathedral
- VIII District, Turku
