= Eira Hospital =

Coordinates: 60°09′28″N 024°56′30″E

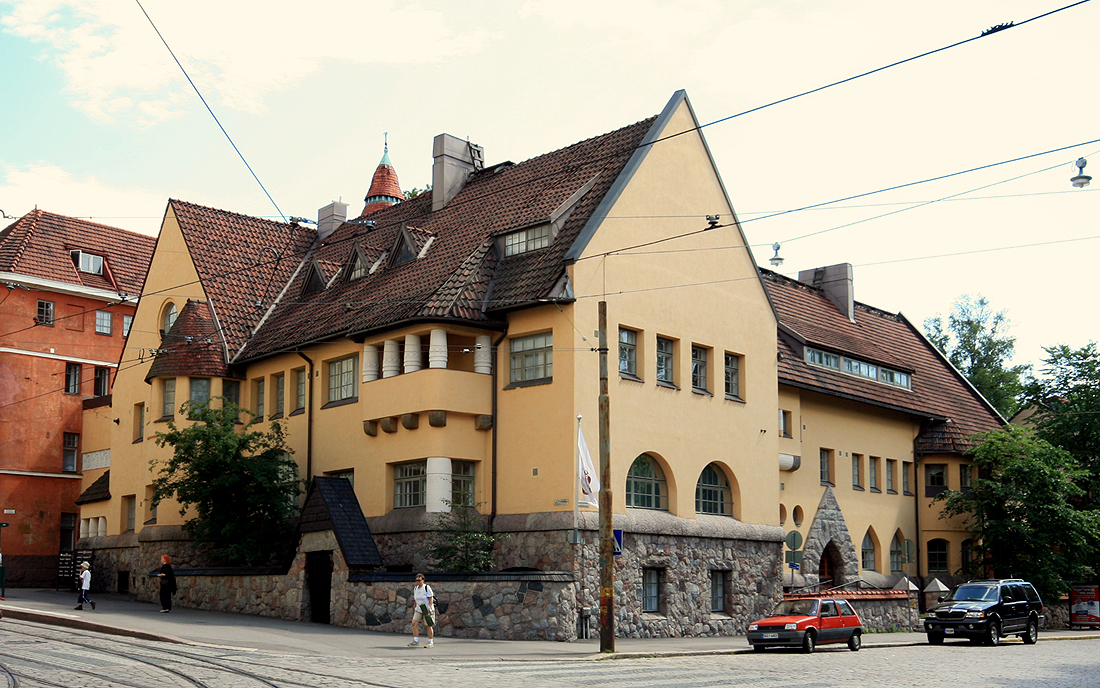
- Eira Hospital

Geography
- Location: southern part of Helsinki, Finland

Links
- Website: www.eiransairaala.fi
- Lists: Hospitals in Finland

Eira Hospital (Finnish: Eiran sairaala, Swedish: Eira sjukhus) is a private hospital in southern part of Helsinki, Finland. It has given its name to the adjacent Eira district of Helsinki.

The architectural landmark is located at Tehtaankatu and Laivurinkatu cross, with address at Tehtaankatu 30 in Helsinki. The building was designed by Lars Sonck and its construction was completed in June 1905. It is named Eira after similar Eira-named hospital in Stockholm. In Icelandic Poetic Edda Eir was the art-of-medicine goddess.
