= List of ambassadors of Italy to Finland =

Coordinates: 60.159029°N 24.957414°E

Ambassador of Italy to Finland
- Emblem of Italy
- Incumbent; Gabriele Altana since May 29, 2018
- Residence: Villa Hjelt
- Inaugural holder: Giulio Marchetti Ferrante
- Formation: September 1, 1919

The Italian ambassador in Helsinki is the official representative of the Government in Rome to the Government of Finland.

== List of representatives ==
Diplomatic accreditation	Ambassador	Observations	List of prime ministers of Italy	President of Finland	Term end
September 1, 1919	Giulio Marchetti Ferrante	Chargé d'affaires	Francesco Saverio Nitti	Kaarlo Juho Ståhlberg	
April 30, 1920	Giulio Marchetti Ferrante	extraordinary envoy and plenipotentiary minister	Francesco Saverio Nitti	Kaarlo Juho Ståhlberg	
January 22, 1924	Giovanni Cesare Majoni		Benito Mussolini	Kaarlo Juho Ståhlberg	
March 5, 1924	Gaetano Paterno di Manchi di Bilici	italienischer Gesandten in Addis Ababa	Benito Mussolini	Kaarlo Juho Ståhlberg	
June 3, 1926	Emilio Pagliano		Benito Mussolini	Lauri Kristian Relander	
November 14, 1929	Attilio Tamaro		Benito Mussolini	Lauri Kristian Relander	
July 26, 1935	Ottaviano Armando Koch	Director-General of Propaganda in 1940	Benito Mussolini	Pehr Evind Svinhufvud	
May 19, 1939	Vittorio Emanuele Bonarelli di Castelbompiano		Benito Mussolini	Kyösti Kallio	
March 13, 1941	Vincenzo Cicconardi	l'uomo a capo della Real Legazione d'Italia a Tallinn.	Benito Mussolini	Risto Ryti	
January 23, 1943	Giovanni-Battista Guarnaschelli		Pietro Badoglio	Risto Ryti	
December 15, 1947	Guido Roncalli di Montorio		Ferruccio Parri	Juho Kusti Paasikivi	
December 12, 1950	Paolo Vita-Finzi		Ferruccio Parri	Juho Kusti Paasikivi	
September 12, 1953	Filippo Zappi	extraordinary envoy and plenipotentiary minister	Giuseppe Pella	Juho Kusti Paasikivi	
November 15, 1955	Filippo Zappi	ambassador	Antonio Segni	Juho Kusti Paasikivi	
July 18, 1956	Alberto Nonis		Antonio Segni	Urho Kekkonen	
December 11, 1958	Roberto Ducci		Amintore Fanfani	Urho Kekkonen	
June 6, 1962	Maurizio de Strobel di Fratta e Campocigno	1970: Ambassador of Italy to India; 1972: Ambassador of Italy to Canada	Fernando Tambroni	Urho Kekkonen	
January 1, 1967	Alessandro Marieni	1965: Ambassador of Italy to Luxembourg	Giovanni Leone	Urho Kekkonen	
October 5, 1971	Marco Favale		Emilio Colombo	Urho Kekkonen	
April 15, 1977	Ugo Barzini		Giulio Andreotti	Urho Kekkonen	
May 23, 1980	Giovanni Saragat		Francesco Cossiga	Urho Kekkonen	
June 20, 1985	Emanuele Costa di Polonghera		Bettino Craxi	Mauno Koivisto	
February 1, 1988	Giancarlo Carrara Cagni		Ciriaco De Mita	Mauno Koivisto	
October 1, 1993	Raniero Avogadro		Carlo Azeglio Ciampi	Mauno Koivisto	
November 2, 1996	Massimo Macchia		Romano Prodi	Martti Ahtisaari	
December 11, 2000	Pietro Lonardo		Giuliano Amato	Tarja Halonen	
February 11, 2004	Ugo Gabriele de Mohr		Silvio Berlusconi	Tarja Halonen	
February 5, 2007	Elisabetta Kelescian		Romano Prodi	Tarja Halonen	
April 4, 2011	Giorgio Visetti	March 2, 2016: Ambassador of Italy to Oman	Silvio Berlusconi	Tarja Halonen	
May 29, 2018	Gabriele Altana		Paolo Gentiloni	Sauli Niinistö	
