= Lars Sonck =

Finnish architect (1870–1956)

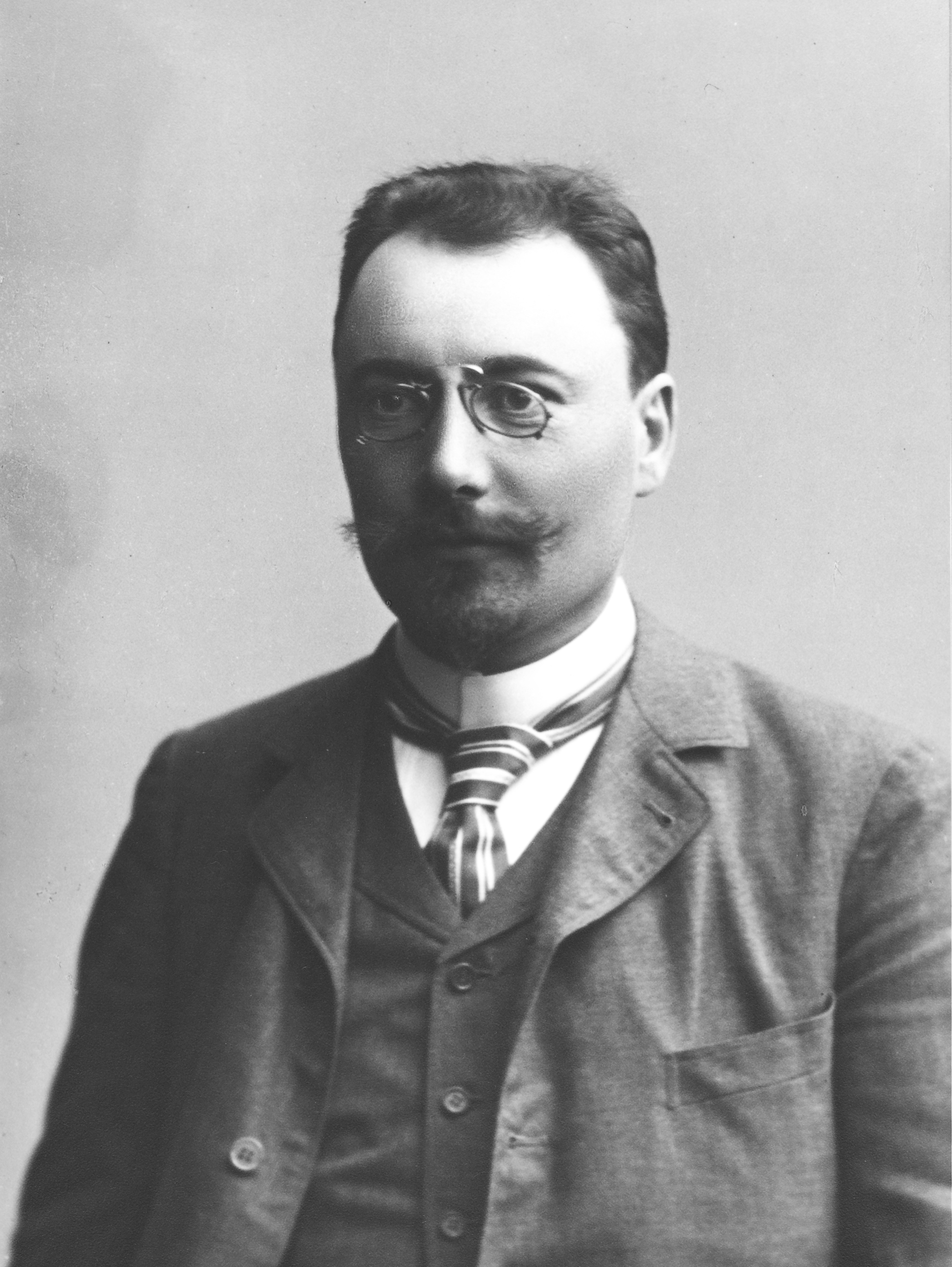
- Born: Lars Eliel Sonck; 10 August 1870; Kälviä, Grand Duchy of Finland, Russian Empire
- Died: 14 March 1956 (aged 85); Helsinki, Finland
- Occupation: Architect
- Buildings: Tampere Cathedral, Tampere; Eira Hospital, Helsinki; Kallio Church, Helsinki; Helsinki Stock Exchange
- Projects: Töölö district plan, Helsinki

Lars Eliel Sonck (10 August 1870 – 14 March 1956) was a Finnish architect. He was a prominent figure in early 20th-century Finnish architecture, known for his role in developing the National Romantic and later Nordic Classicism movements in Finland.

Sonck graduated from the Polytechnic Institute of Helsinki (now Aalto University) in 1894. That same year, at age 23, he won the design competition for St Michael's Church, Turku, marking his professional breakthrough. While the church was designed in the Neo-Gothic style, Sonck’s later work evolved through Art Nouveau, National Romanticism, and ultimately Nordic Classicism during the 1920s.

== Architectural style and urban planning ==
Sonck was one of the leading figures in shaping a distinctive Finnish architectural identity at a time when Finland was part of the Russian Empire. His early works in the National Romantic style reflected elements of Romanesque architecture and traditional Finnish medieval and vernacular buildings. He worked alongside architects such as Herman Gesellius, Armas Lindgren, and Eliel Saarinen to define this style.

Notable examples of Sonck’s work include:

- Kallio Church (1912), Helsinki – Neo-Romanesque
- Kultaranta (1916), the summer residence of the President of Finland, Naantali – Neo-Romanesque
- Tampere Cathedral (1907) – National Romantic
- Eira Hospital (1905), Helsinki – Art Nouveau
- Ainola (1903), home of composer Jean Sibelius – Art Nouveau
- Housing blocks on Museokatu, Töölö, Helsinki (c. 1920) – Nordic Classicism
- Mikael Agricola Church (1935), Helsinki – Nordic Classicism

Sonck also contributed significantly to urban planning. He participated in Finland’s first town planning competition (1898–1900), for the Töölö district of Helsinki. His entry, influenced by the picturesque planning principles of Camillo Sitte, emphasized curved streets and medieval urban character. Although first prize went to Gustaf Nyström, Sonck’s ideas were partially incorporated into the final city plan developed by Nyström and later refined by Bertel Jung in 1916.

Historian Pekka Korvenmaa noted that Sonck’s drawings conveyed a vision inspired by Central European urban forms, aiming to recreate the atmosphere of medieval cities.

== Selected works ==
- St Michael's Church, Turku (1899–1905)
- Headquarters of the Helsinki Telephone Association (1903–1907)
- Eira Hospital, Helsinki (1905)
- Tampere Cathedral (1902–1907)
- Ainola, Järvenpää (1903–1904)
- Kallio Church, Helsinki (1908–1912)
- Helsinki Stock Exchange (1911)
- Kultaranta, Naantali (1920)
- City Hall, Mariehamn (1939)
- Mikael Agricola Church, Helsinki (1935)

== Gallery ==
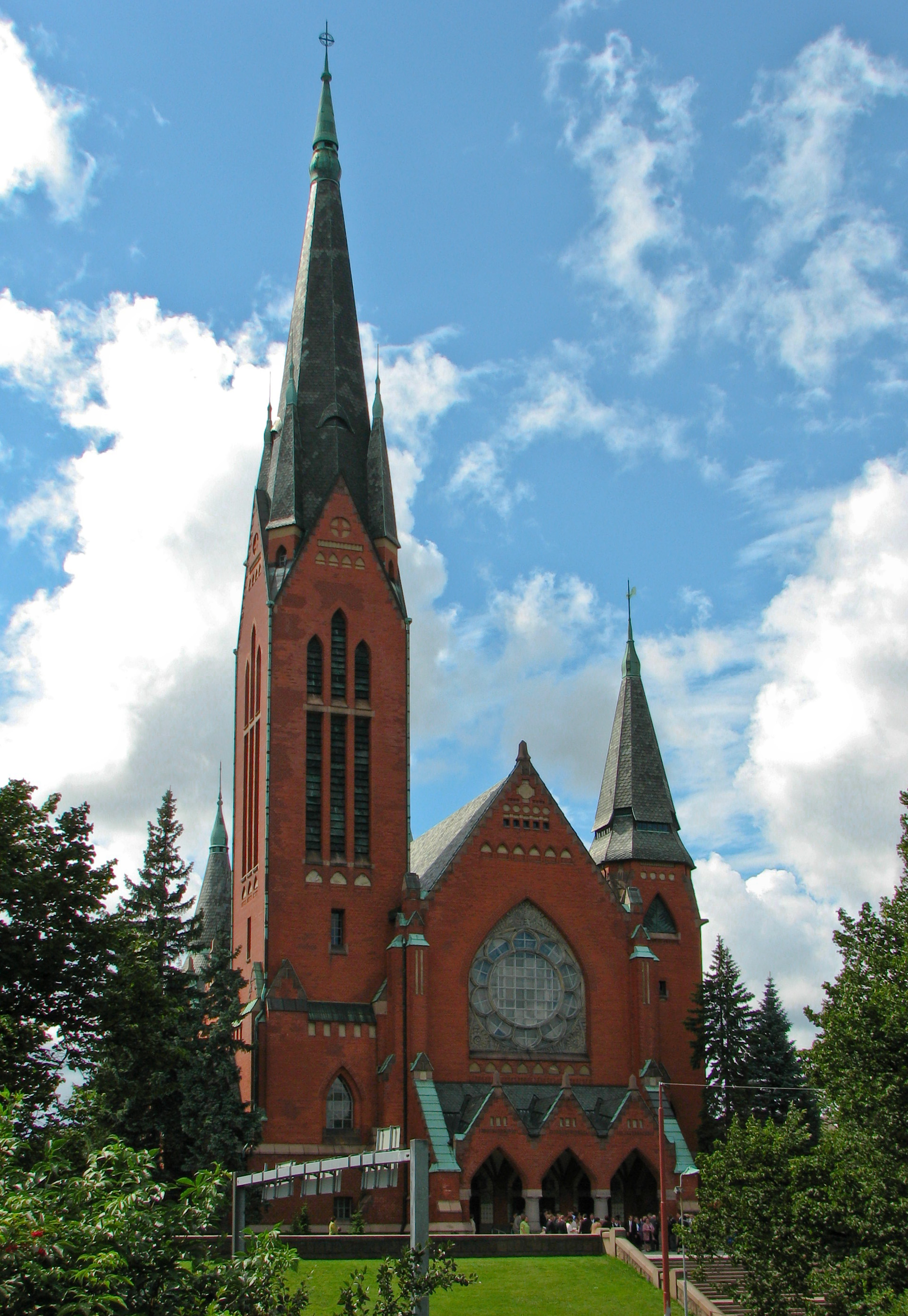
St Michael's Church, Turku (1899–1905)

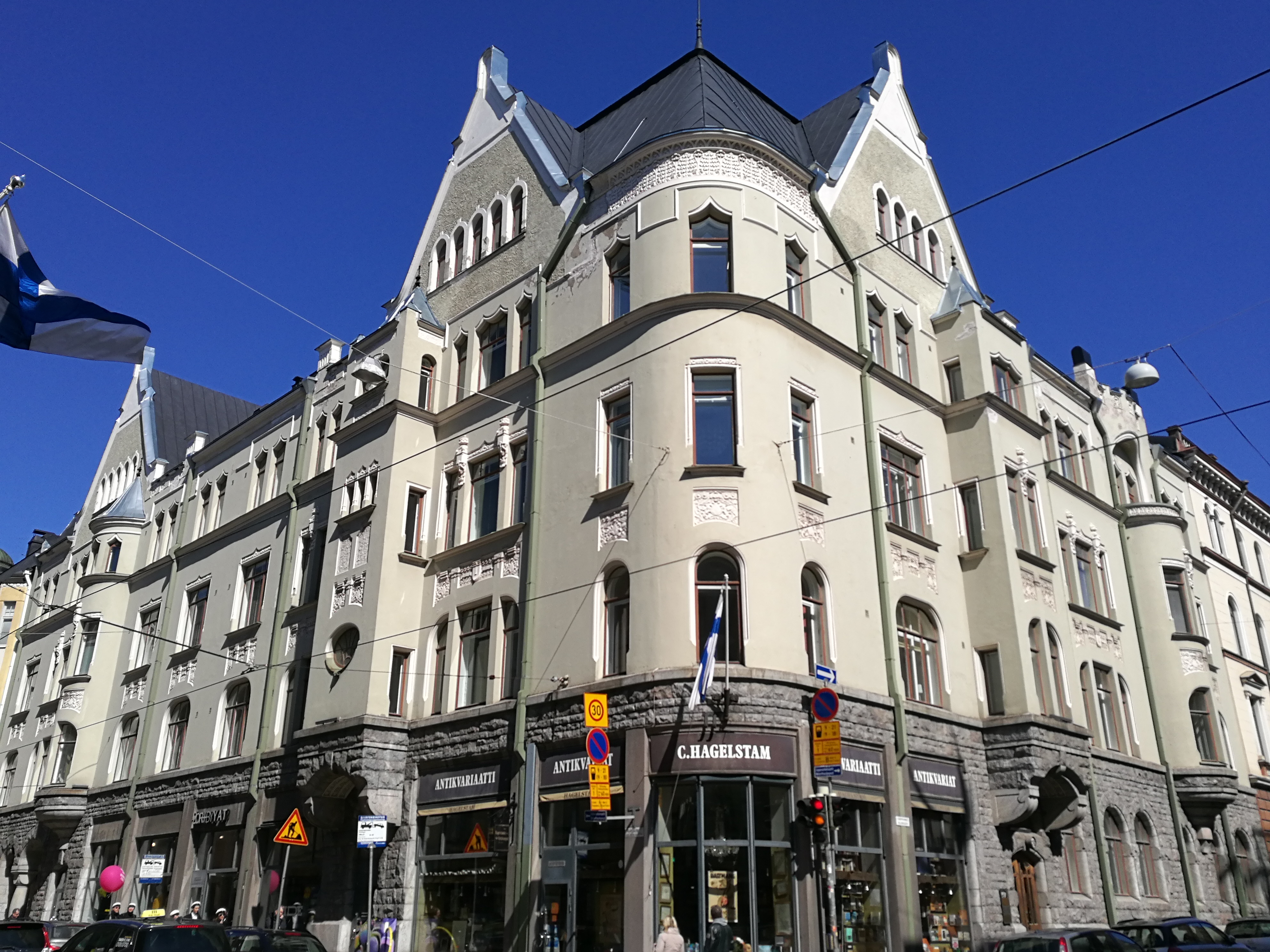
Uudenmaankatu 25 / Frederikinkatu 35, Helsinki (1900)

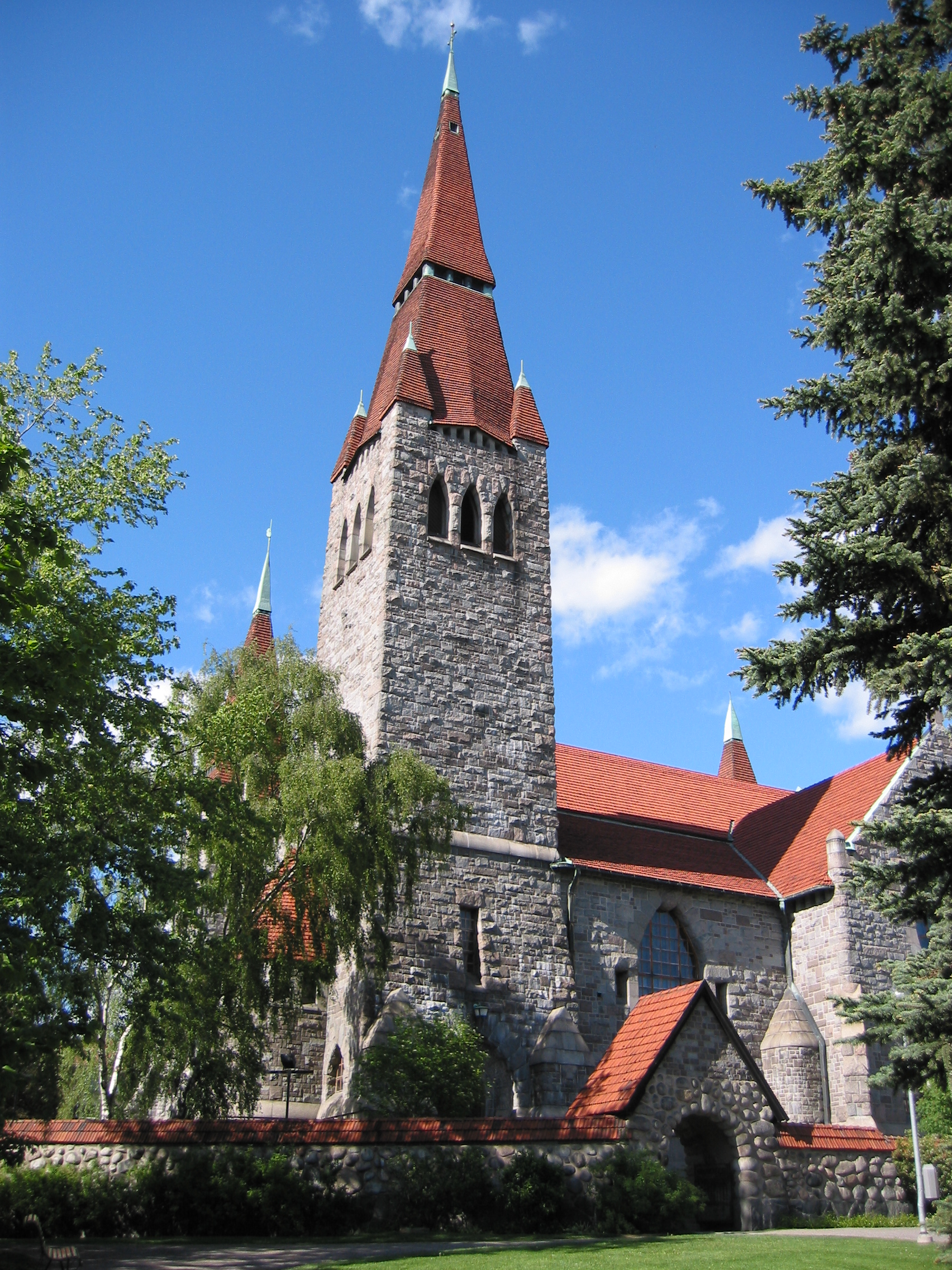
Tampere Cathedral (1902–1907)

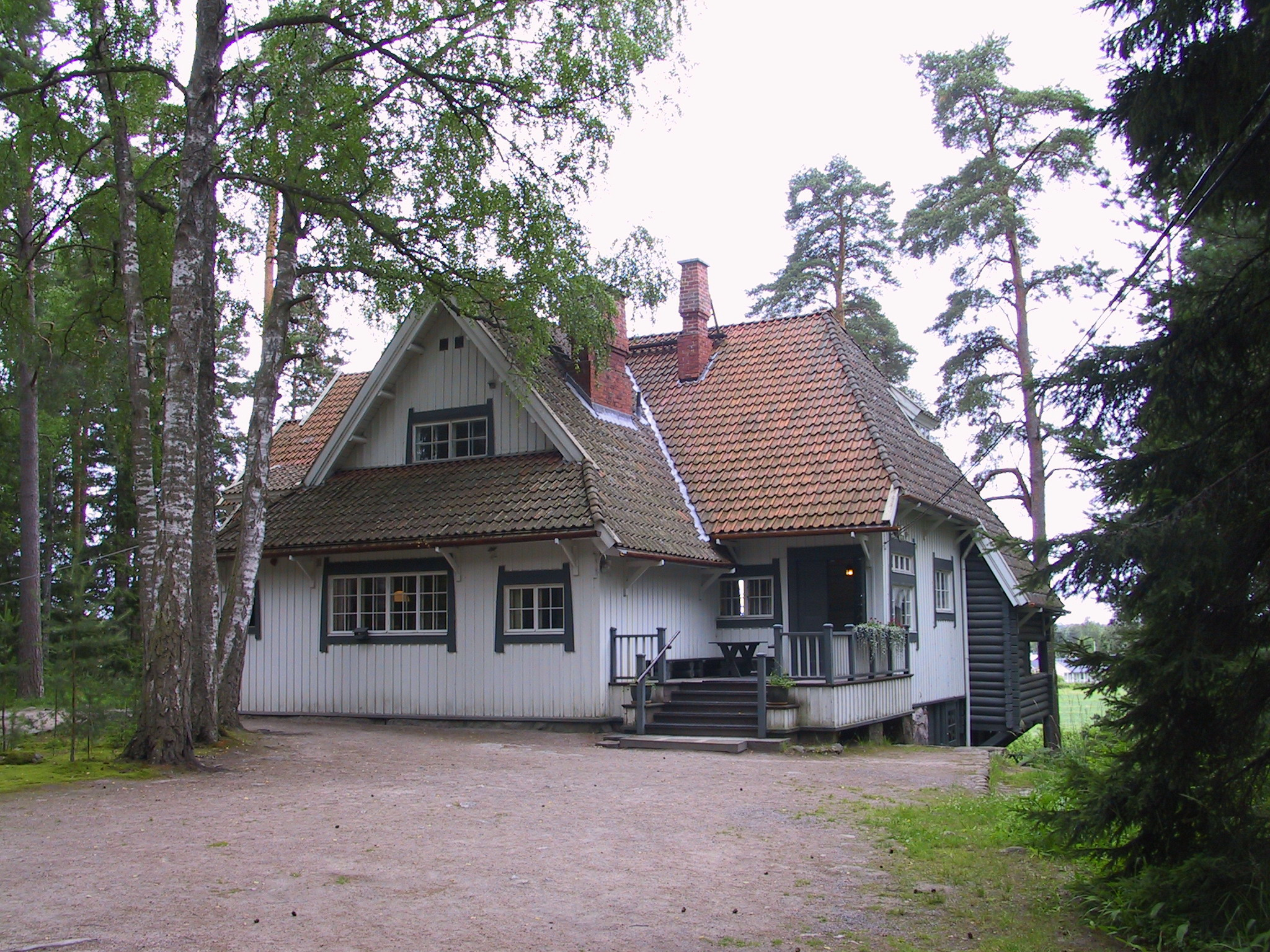
Ainola, Järvenpää – home of Jean Sibelius (1904)

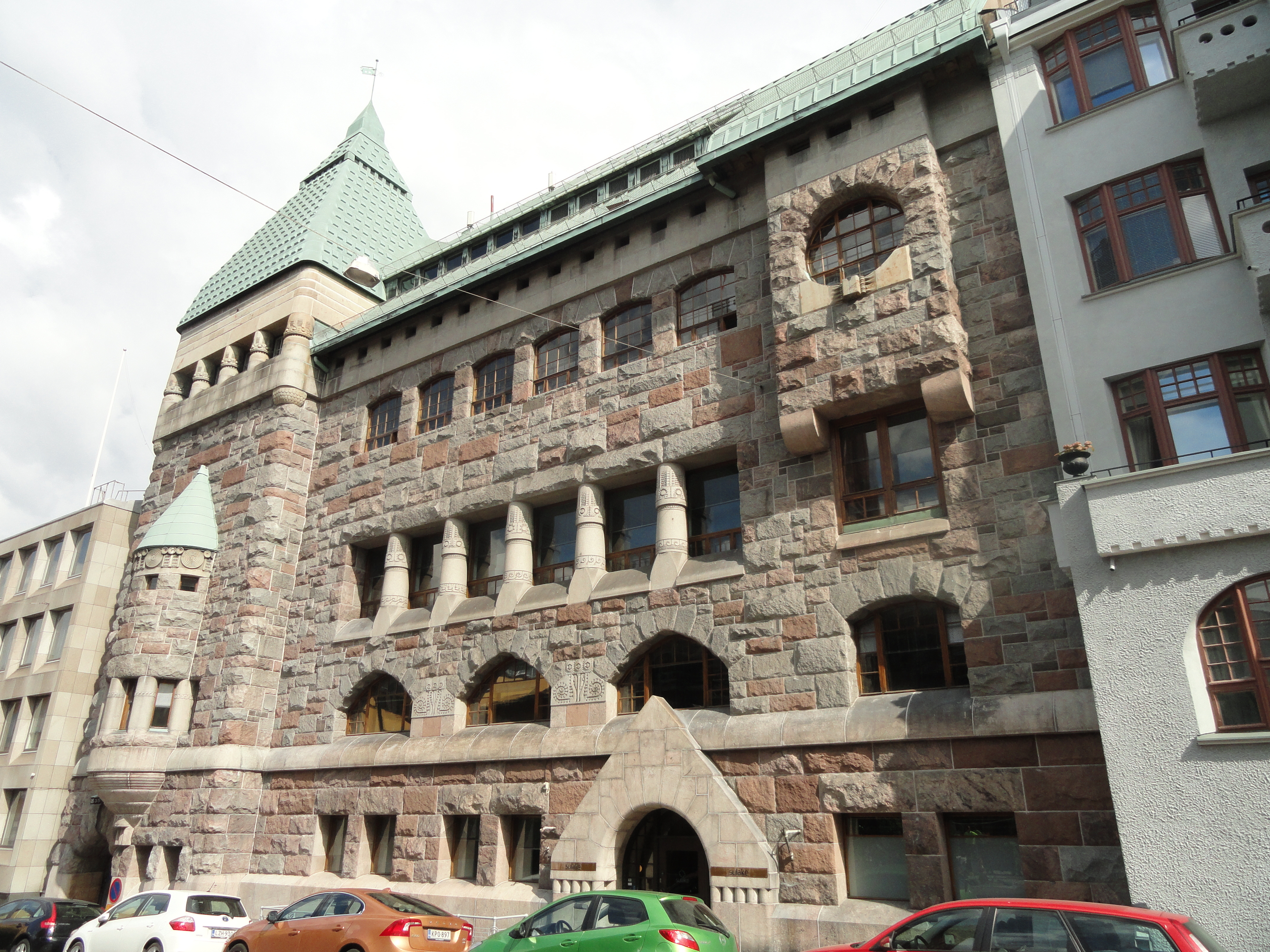
Helsinki Telephone Association HQ (1903–1907)

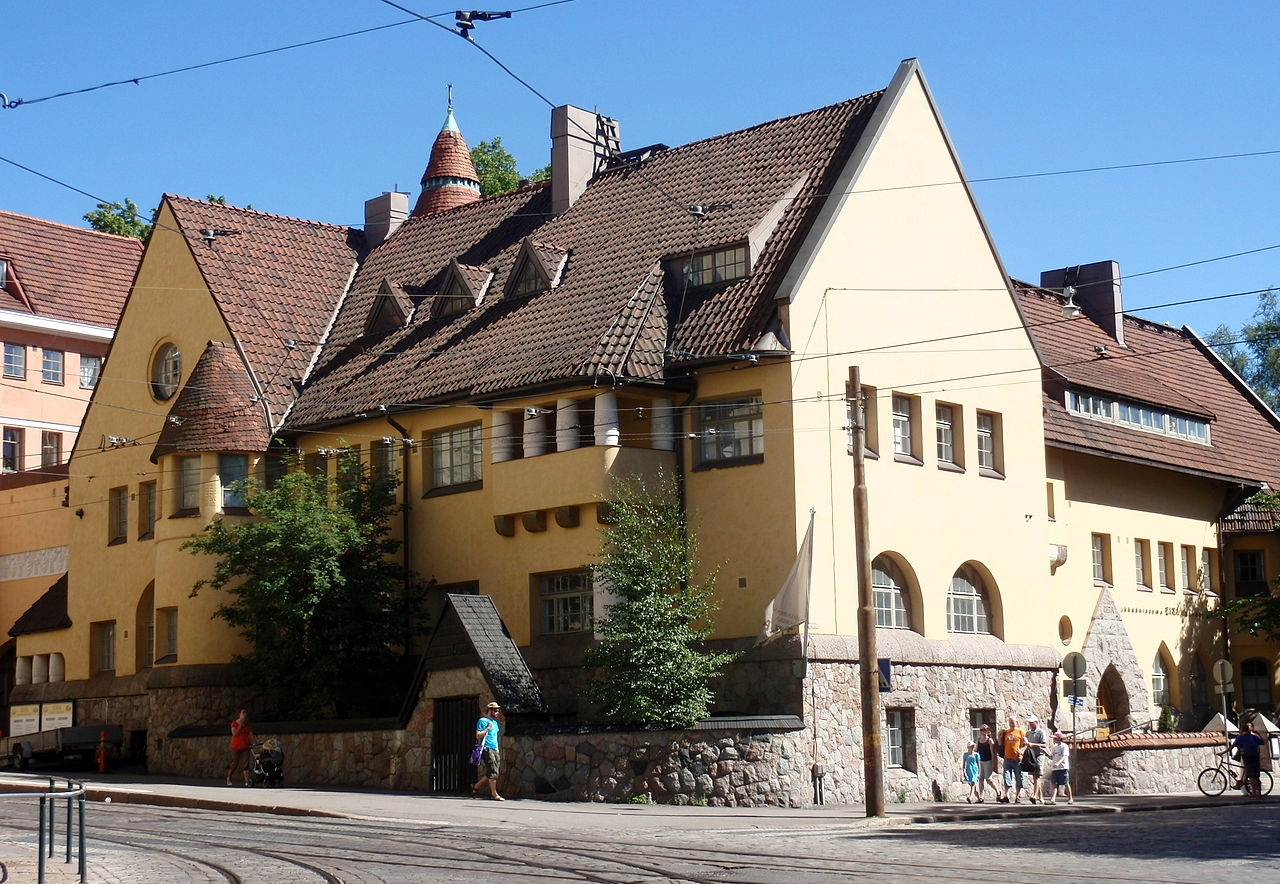
Eira Hospital, Helsinki (1905)

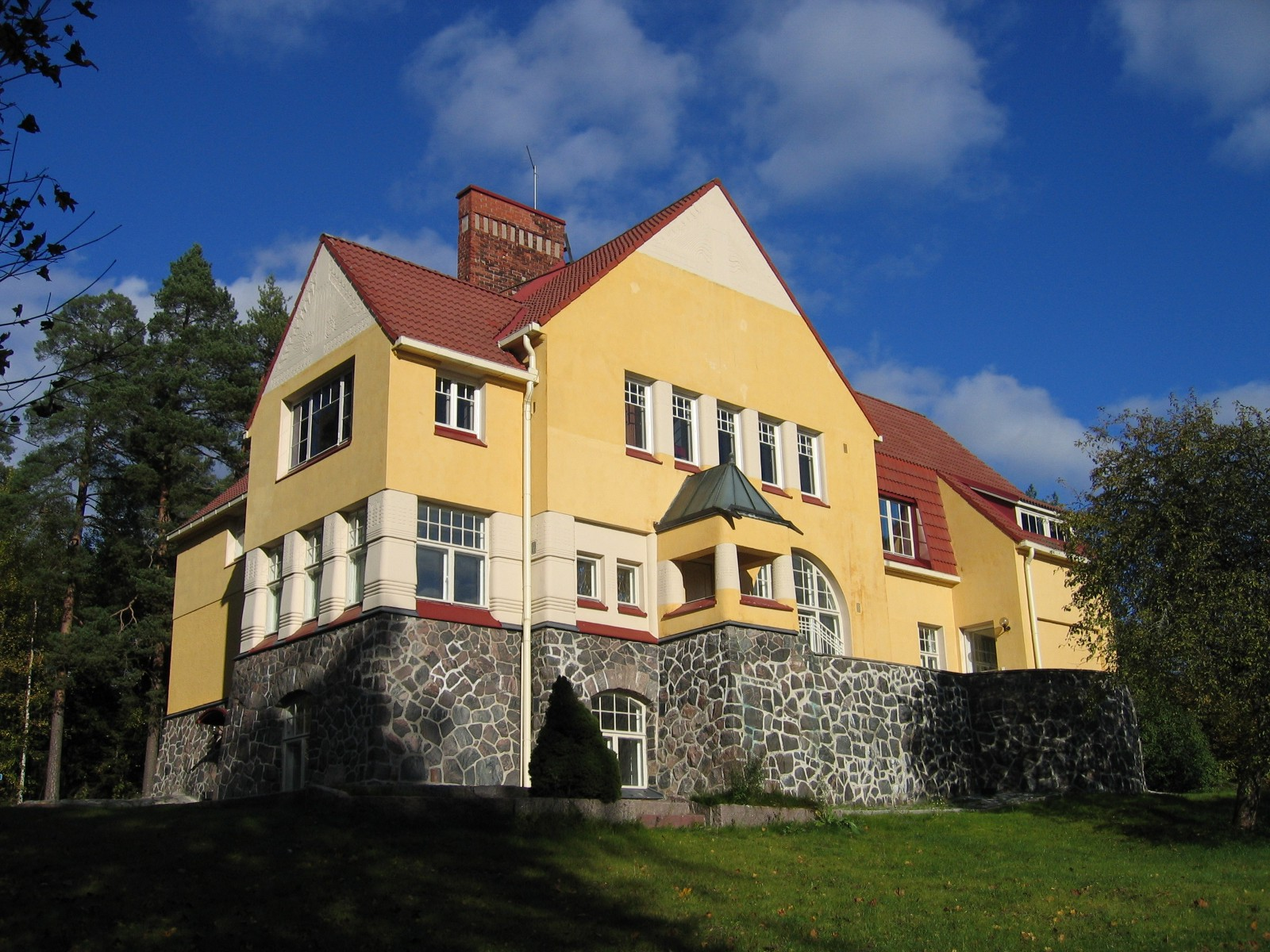
Villa Vallmogård, Kauniainen (1907)

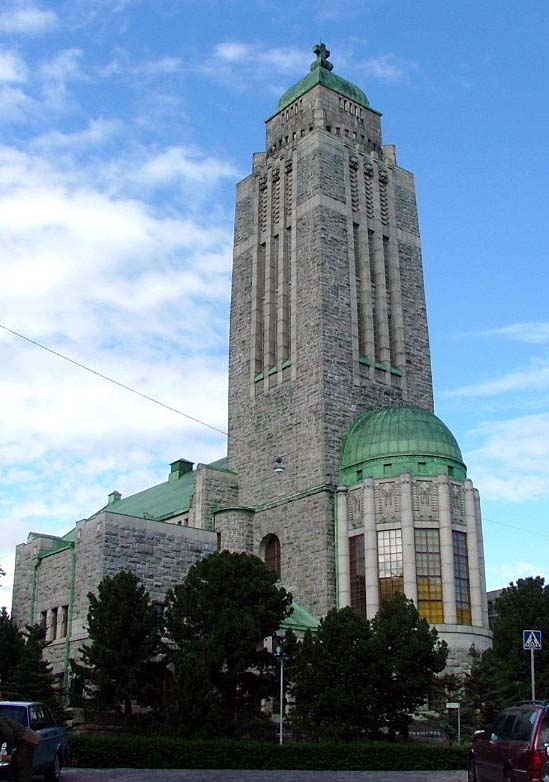
Kallio Church, Helsinki (1908–1912)

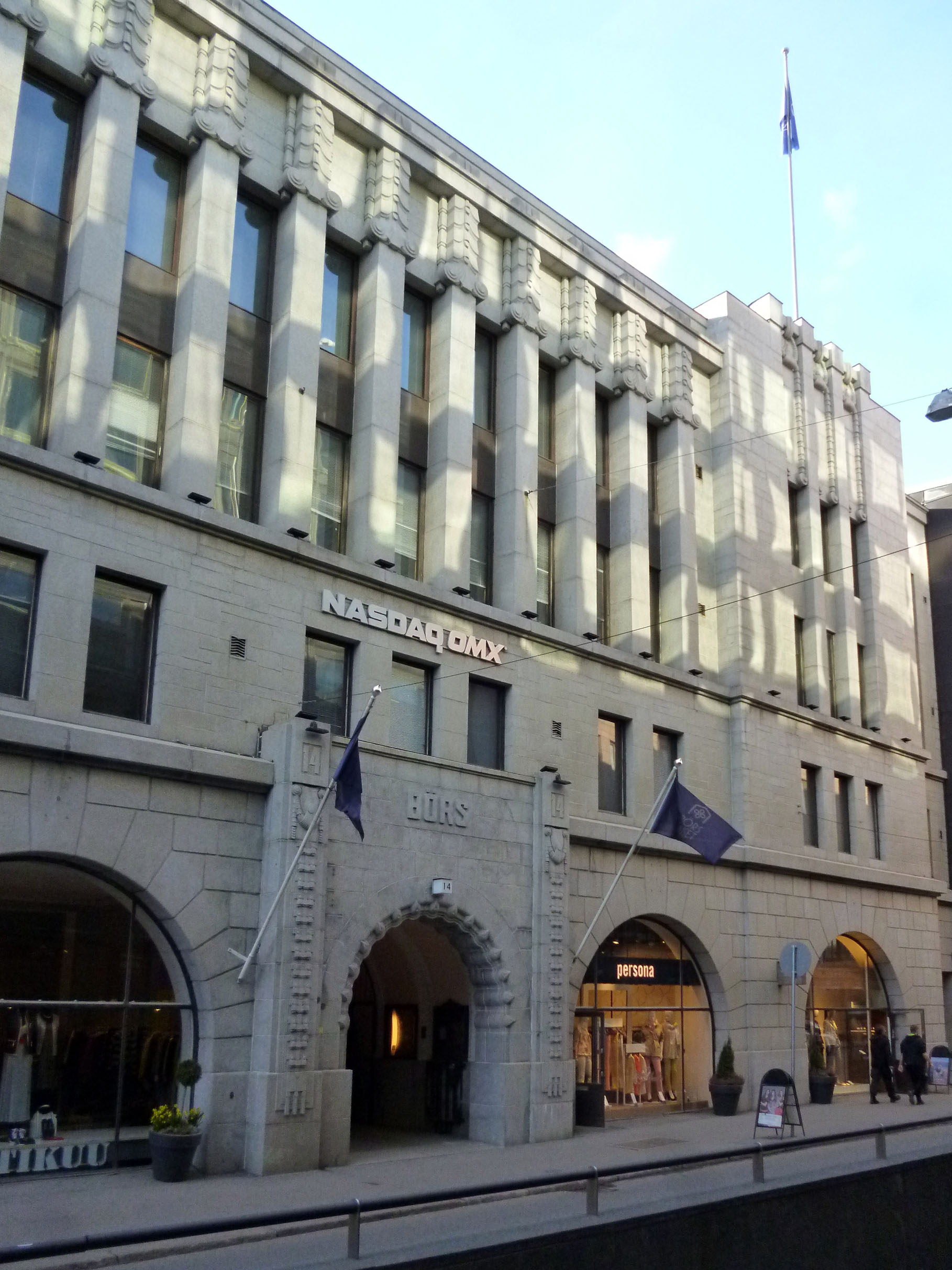
Helsinki Stock Exchange (1911)

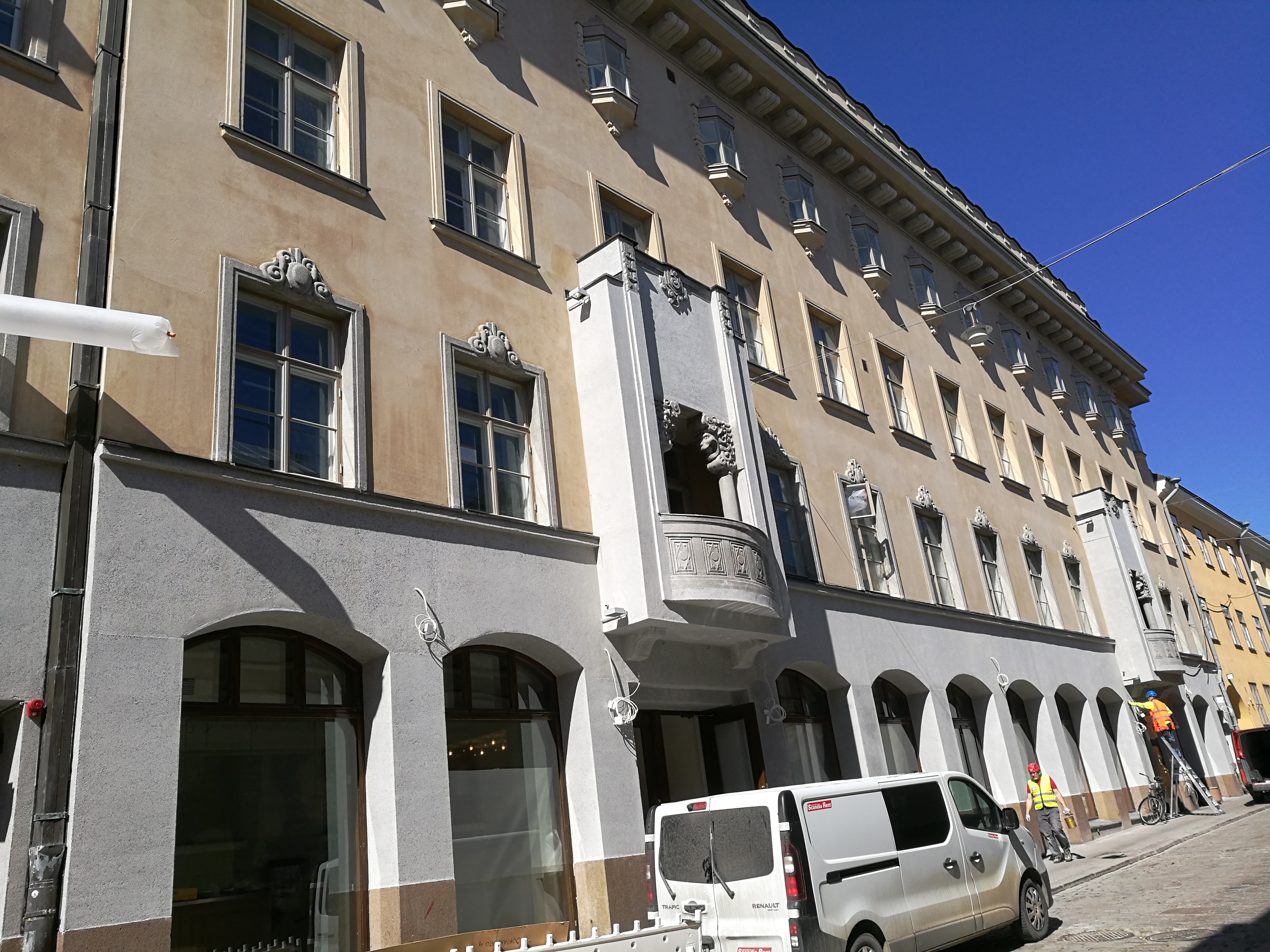
Former Helsinki City Museum building (1913)

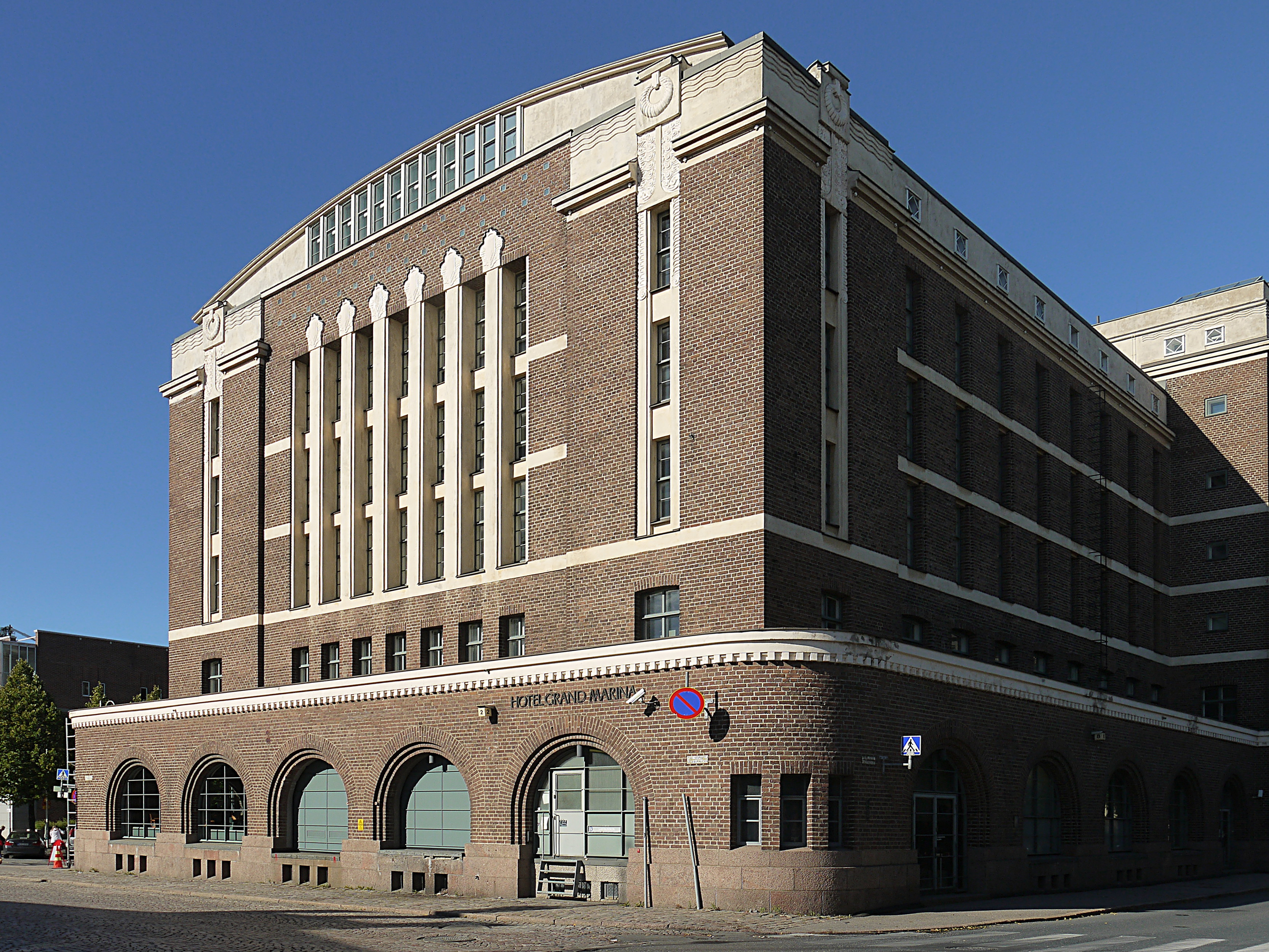
Hotel Grand Marina, Helsinki (1913)

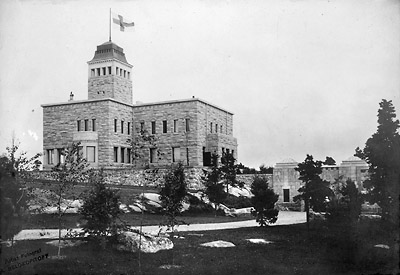
Kultaranta, Naantali – presidential summer residence (1920)

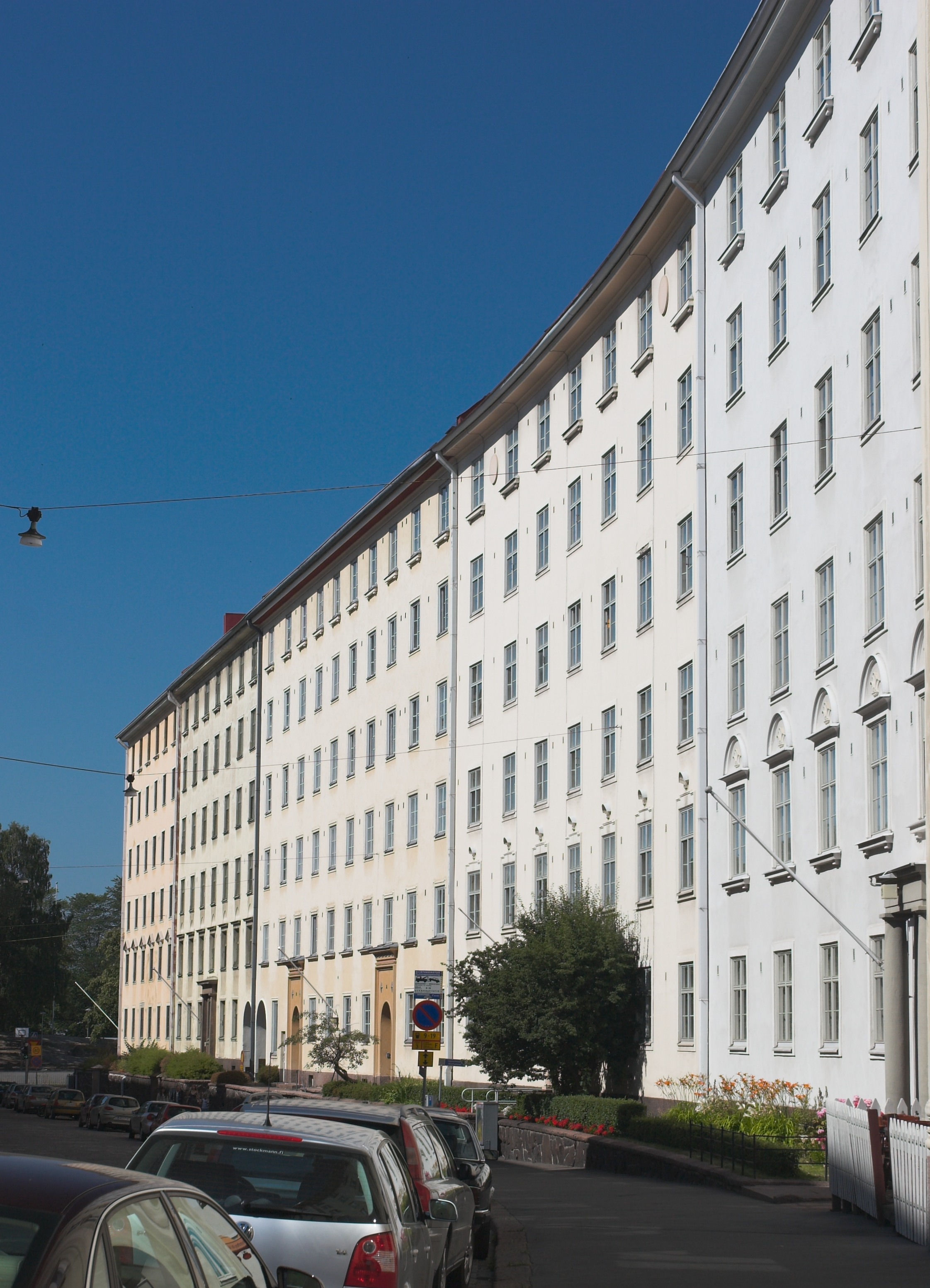
Museokatu, Töölö, Helsinki (1920)

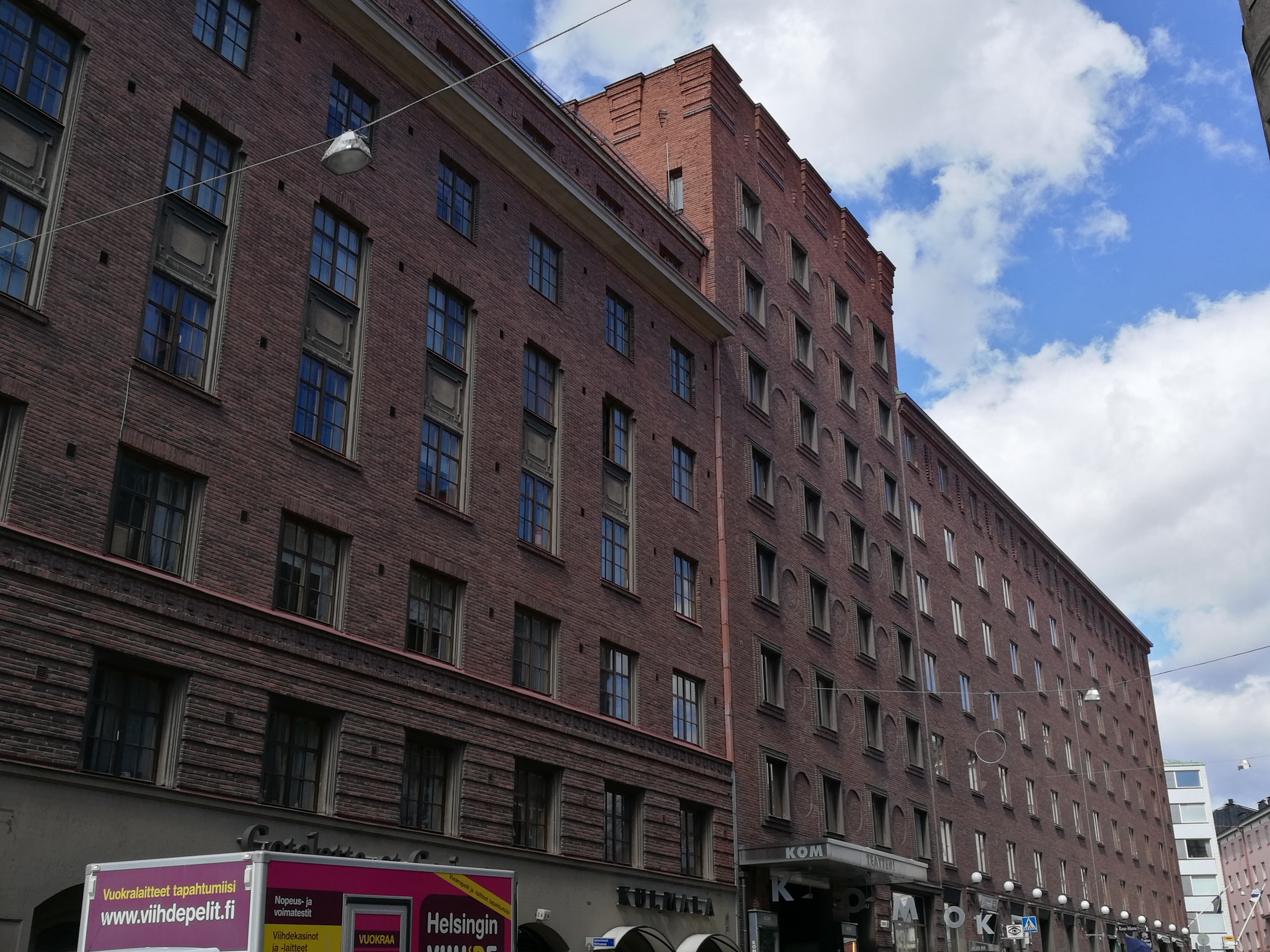
Tehtaankatu 11–13, Helsinki (1925–1929)

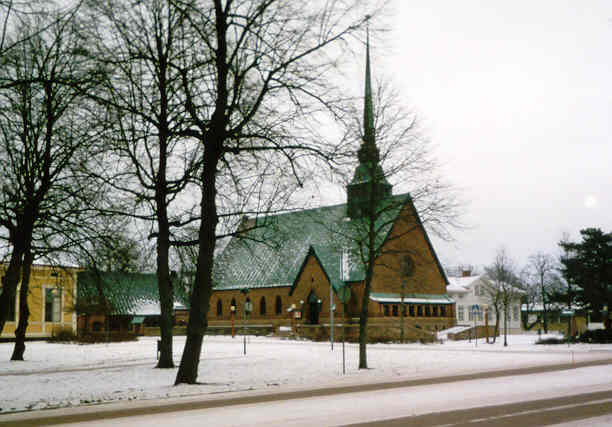
Church in Mariehamn (1929)

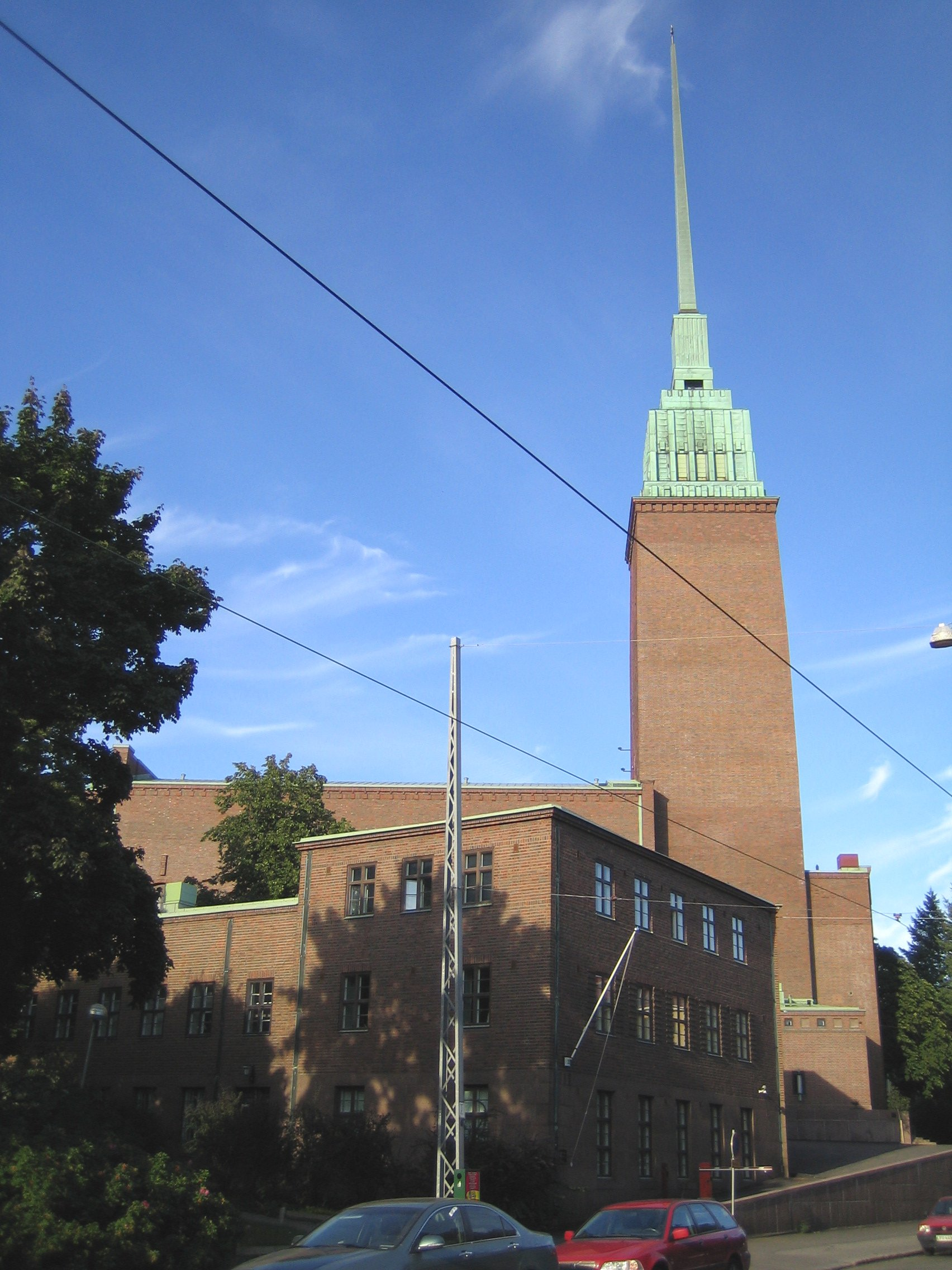
Mikael Agricola Church, Helsinki (1935)

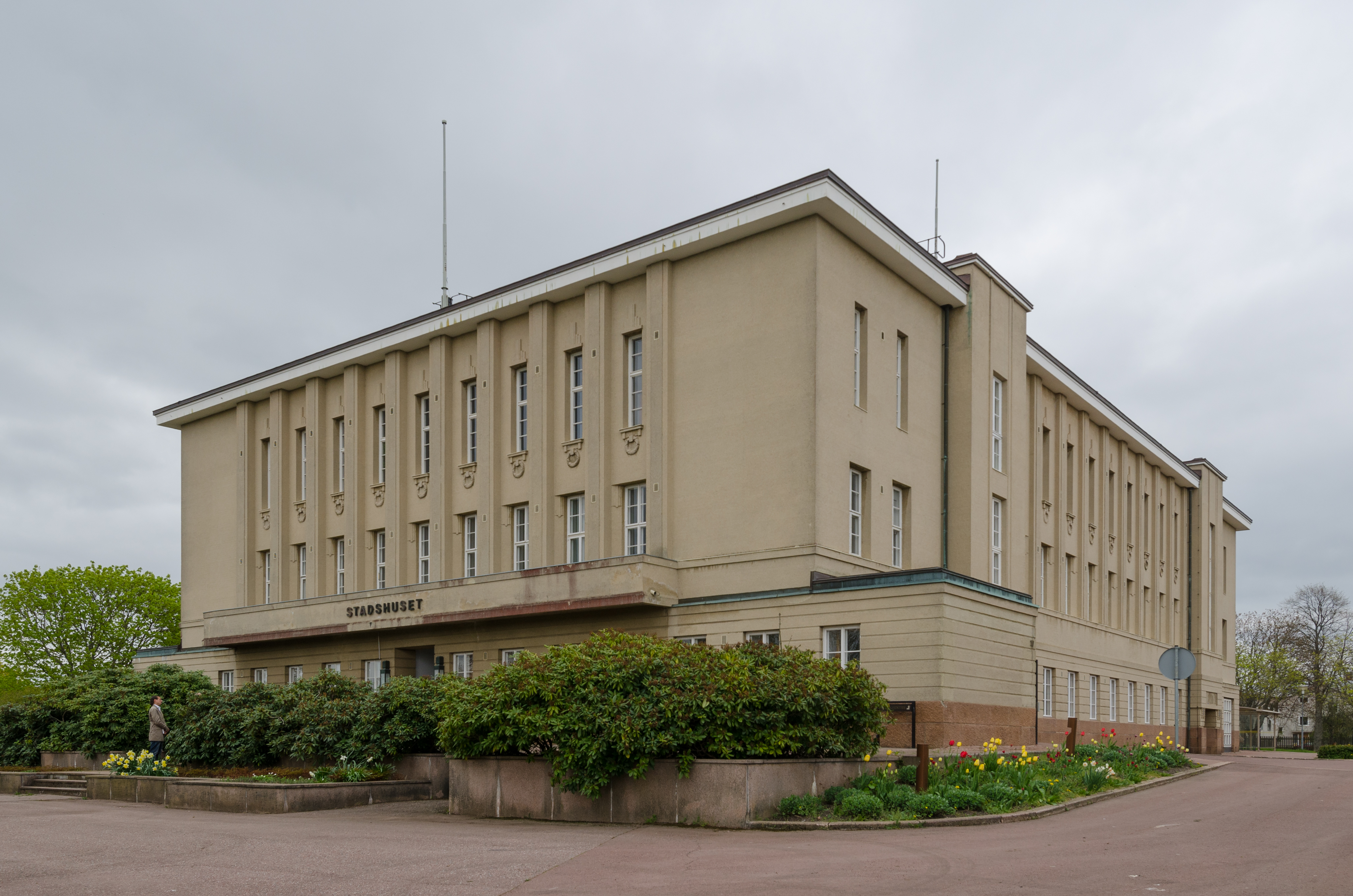
City Hall, Mariehamn (1939)

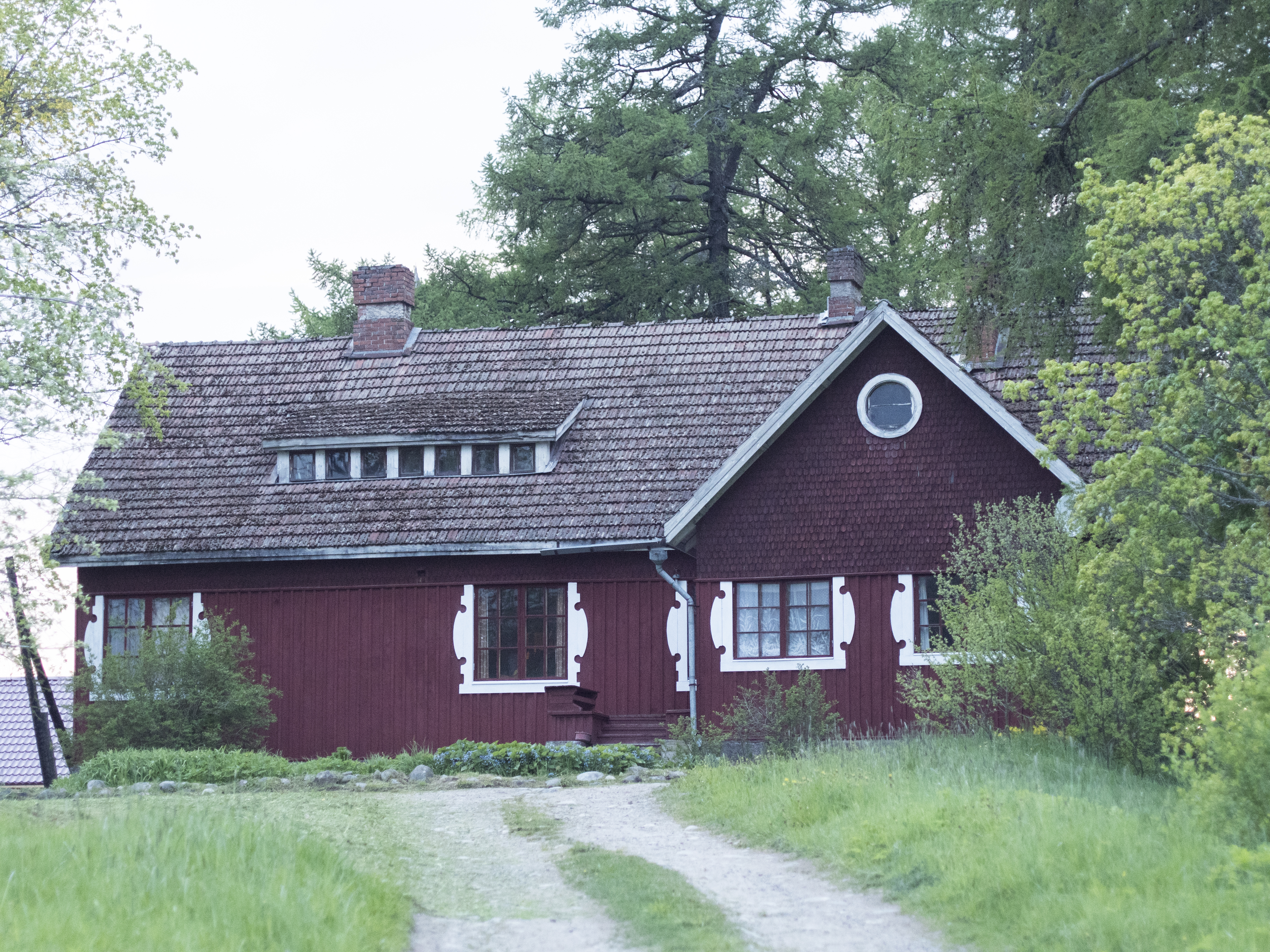
House for Sonck's cousin in Kurkijoki, Karelia (1914)

== See also ==
- Architecture of Finland
