= Mikael Agricola Church =

Coordinates: 60.1583°N 24.9389°E

Mikael Agricola church
- Finnish: Mikael Agricolan kirkko Swedish: Mikael Agricola kyrka
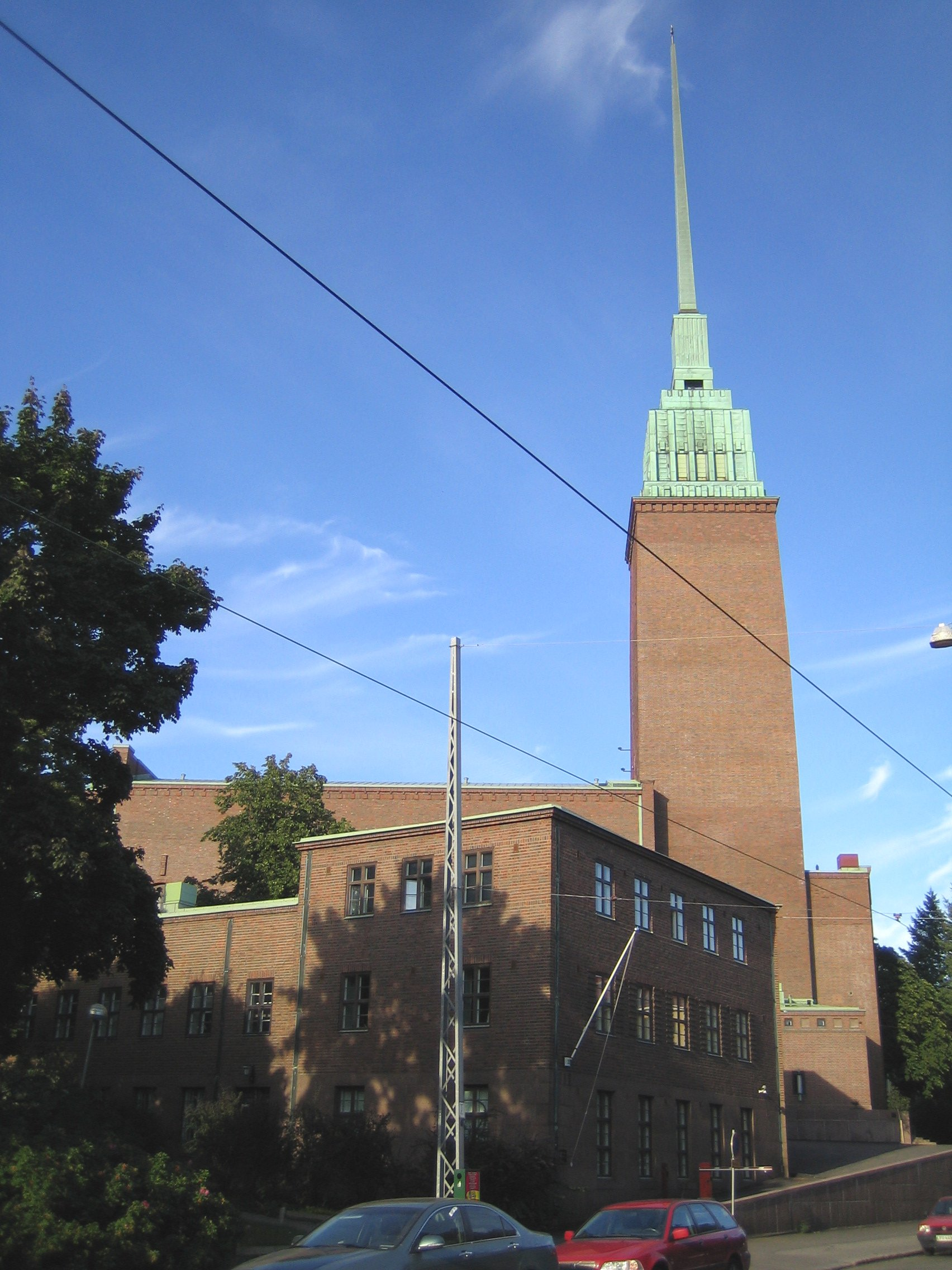
- Mikael Agricola Church
- Mikael Agricola church
- Location: Punavuori, Helsinki
- Country: Finland
- Denomination: Lutheran

History
- Status: active

Architecture
- Architect: Lars Sonck
- Completed: 1935

Specifications
- Capacity: 850

Administration
- Diocese: Helsinki Diocese
- Parish: Helsinki Cathedral Parish

Mikael Agricola Church (Finnish: Mikael Agricolan kirkko, Swedish: Mikael Agricola kyrka) is a Lutheran church located in the Punavuori district of Helsinki, Finland. It was designed by Lars Sonck and built between 1933 and 1935. The church was inaugurated on 14 April 1935. It is named after bishop Mikael Agricola.

== Architecture ==
The church is made of red bricks. The tower of the church is 97 meters high, the top reaching up to 103 meters above sea level. The 30-meter spike of the tower can be retracted if necessary as it fits inside the tower structure. This was done in the Winter War and the Continuation War so that the tower wouldn't act as a navigational aid to enemy bombers.

The church hall seats 850 people. The crypt can also be used for events for 200 people.

== Gallery ==
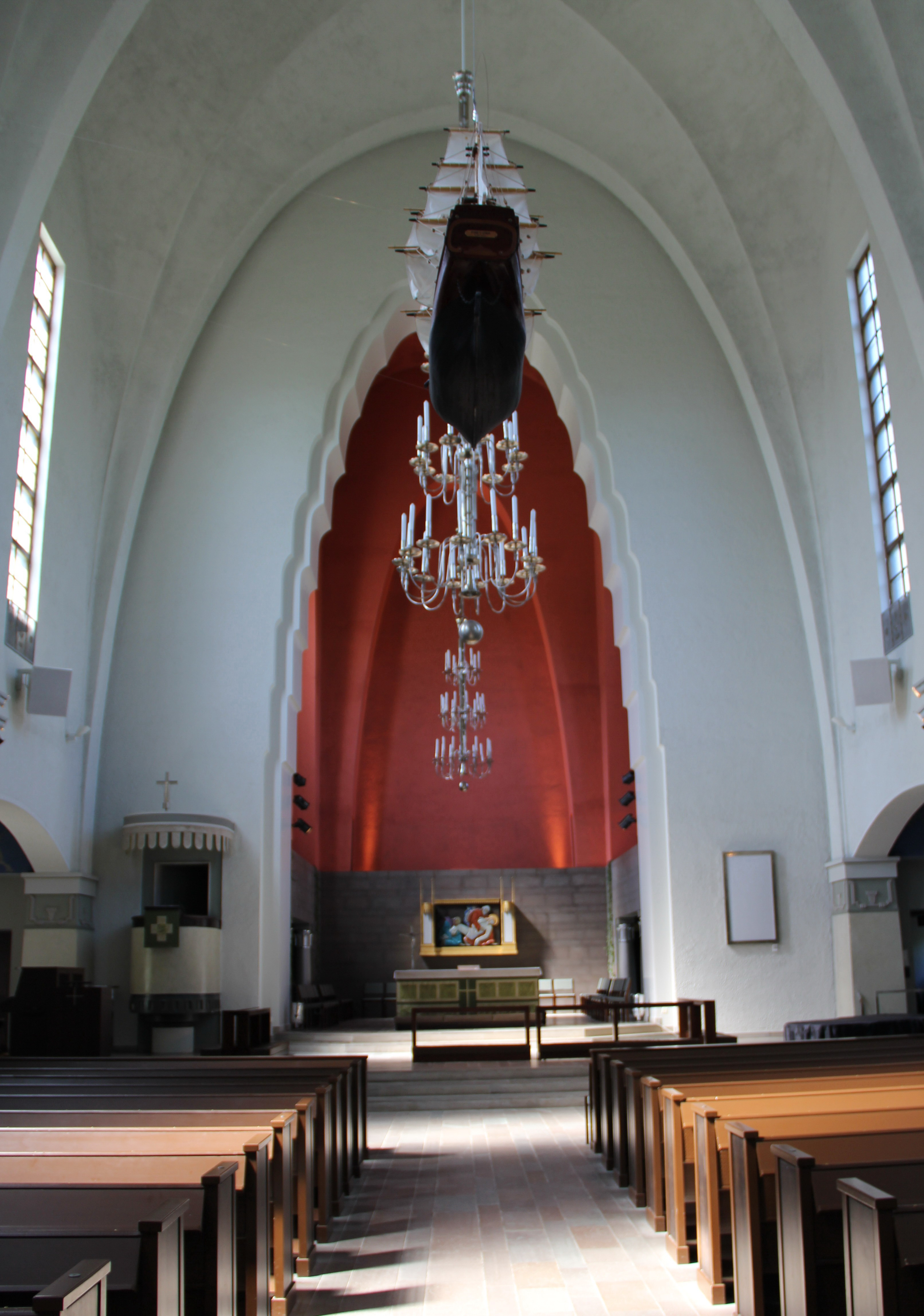
View towards the altar

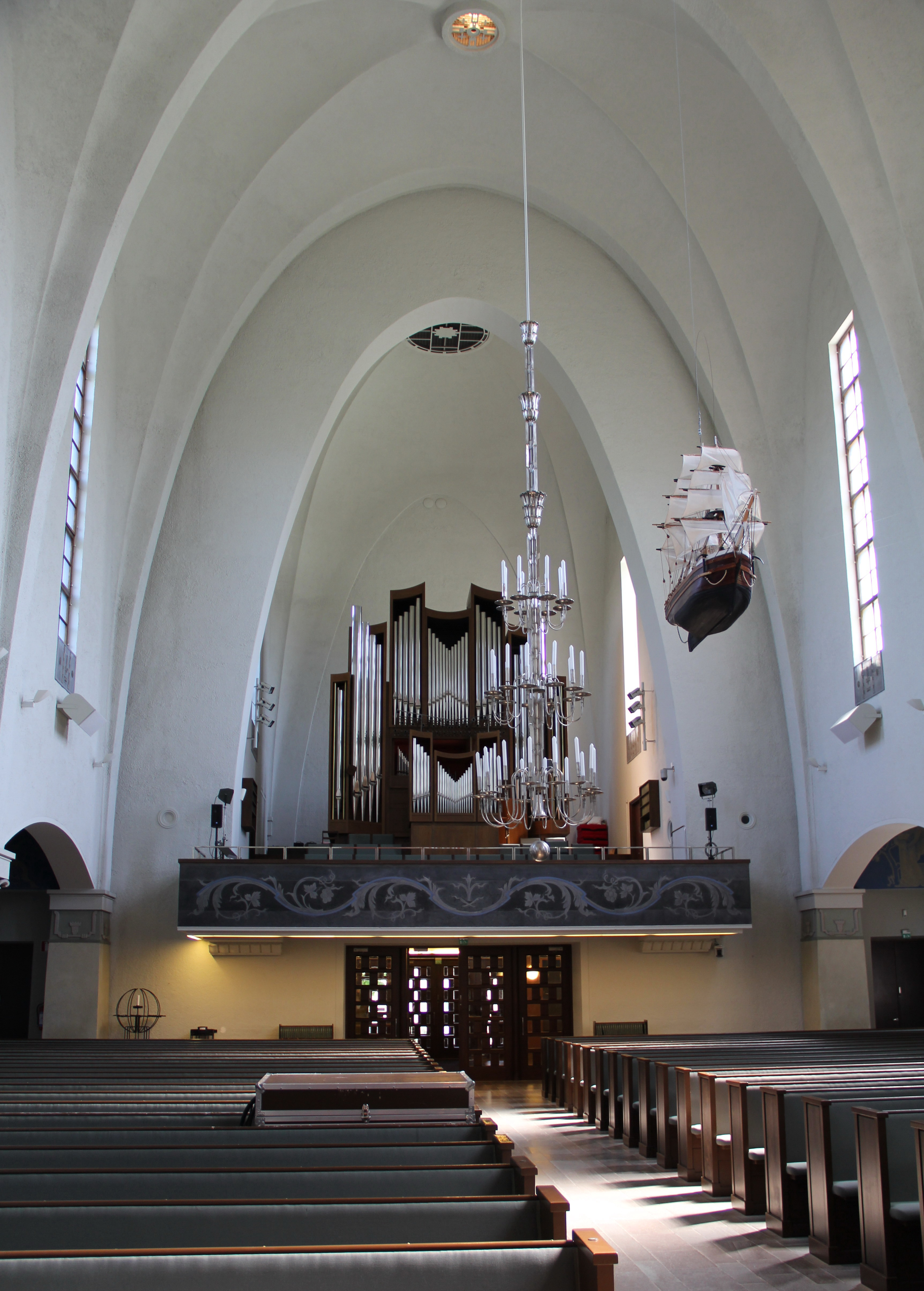
View towards the organ

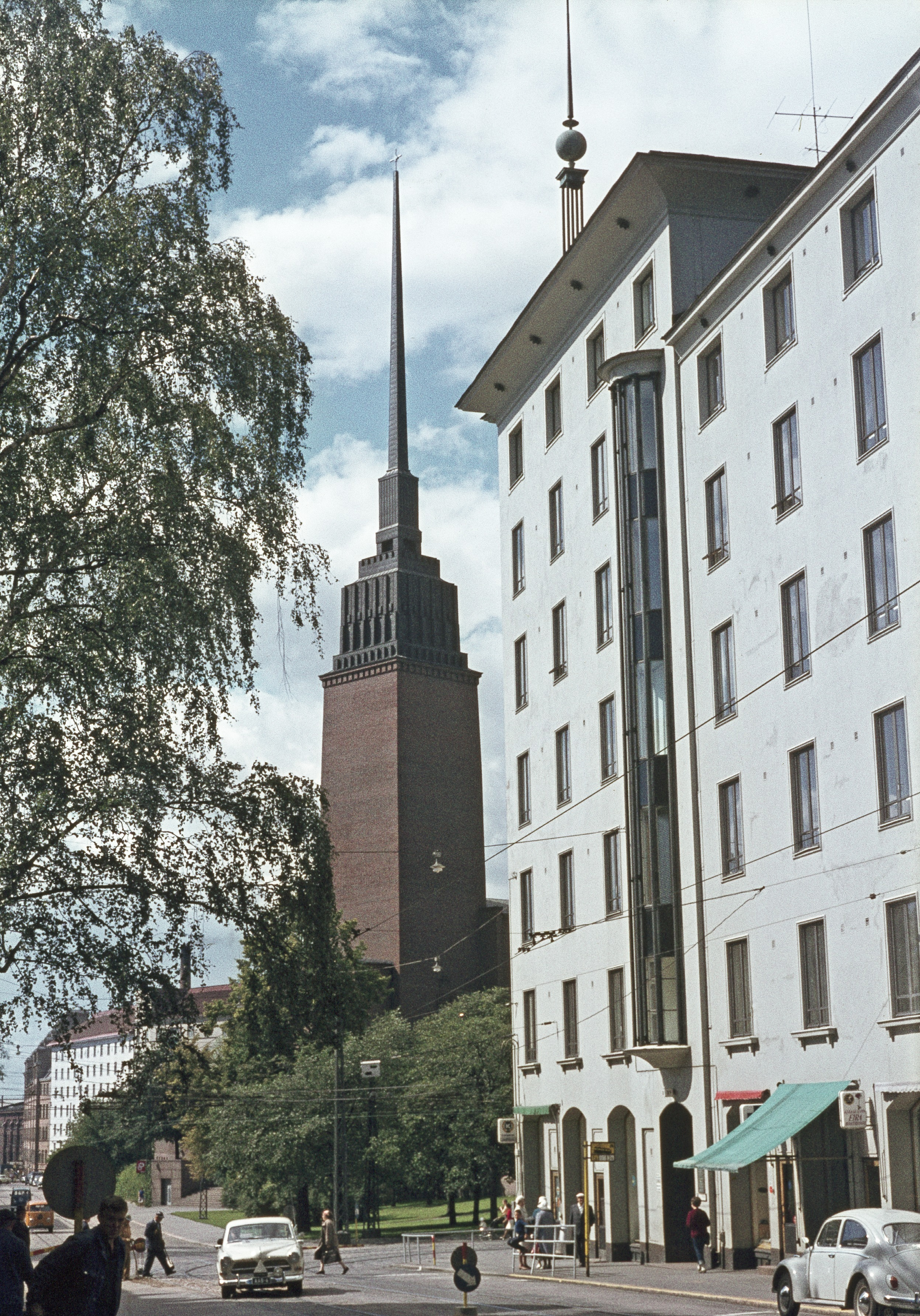
View of the church in the 1960s

== See also ==
- Kallio Church, another Lars Sonck designed church in Helsinki
