= Tähtitorninvuori =

Hill in Helsinki, Finland

Coordinates: 60°9′42.6″N 24°57′17″E

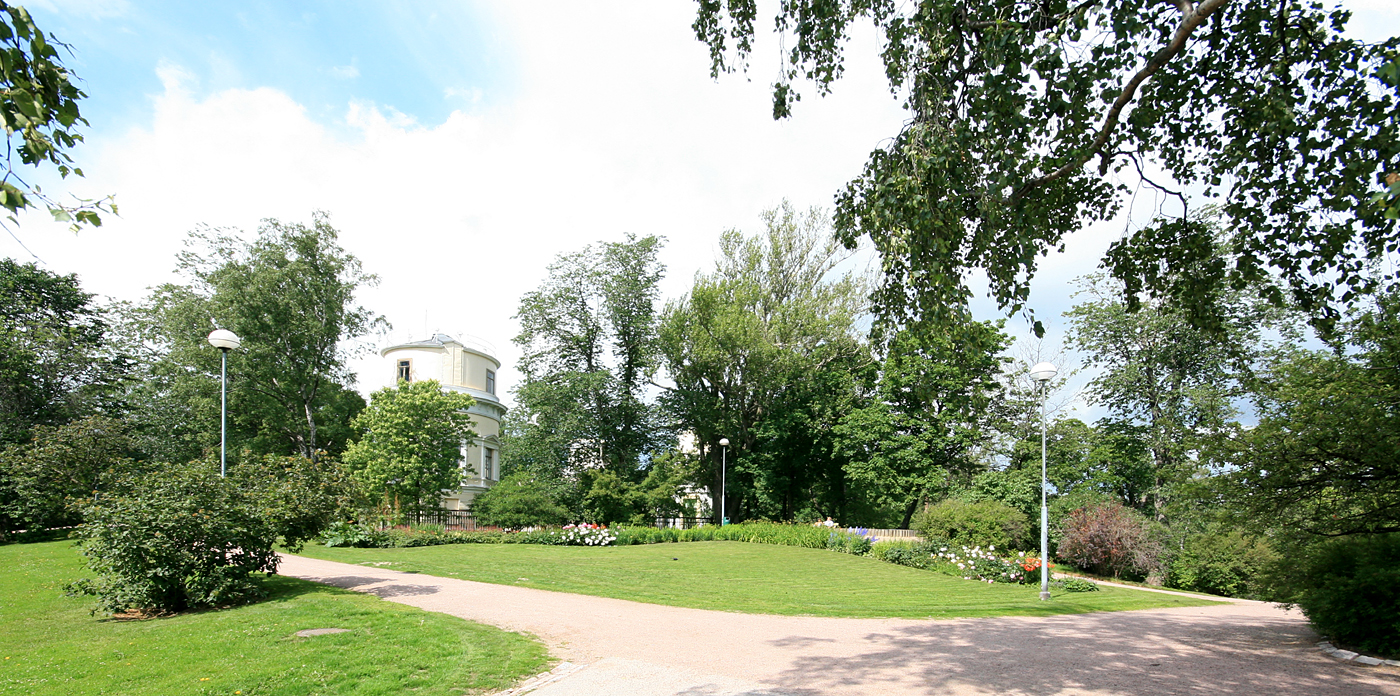
Tähtitornin vuori

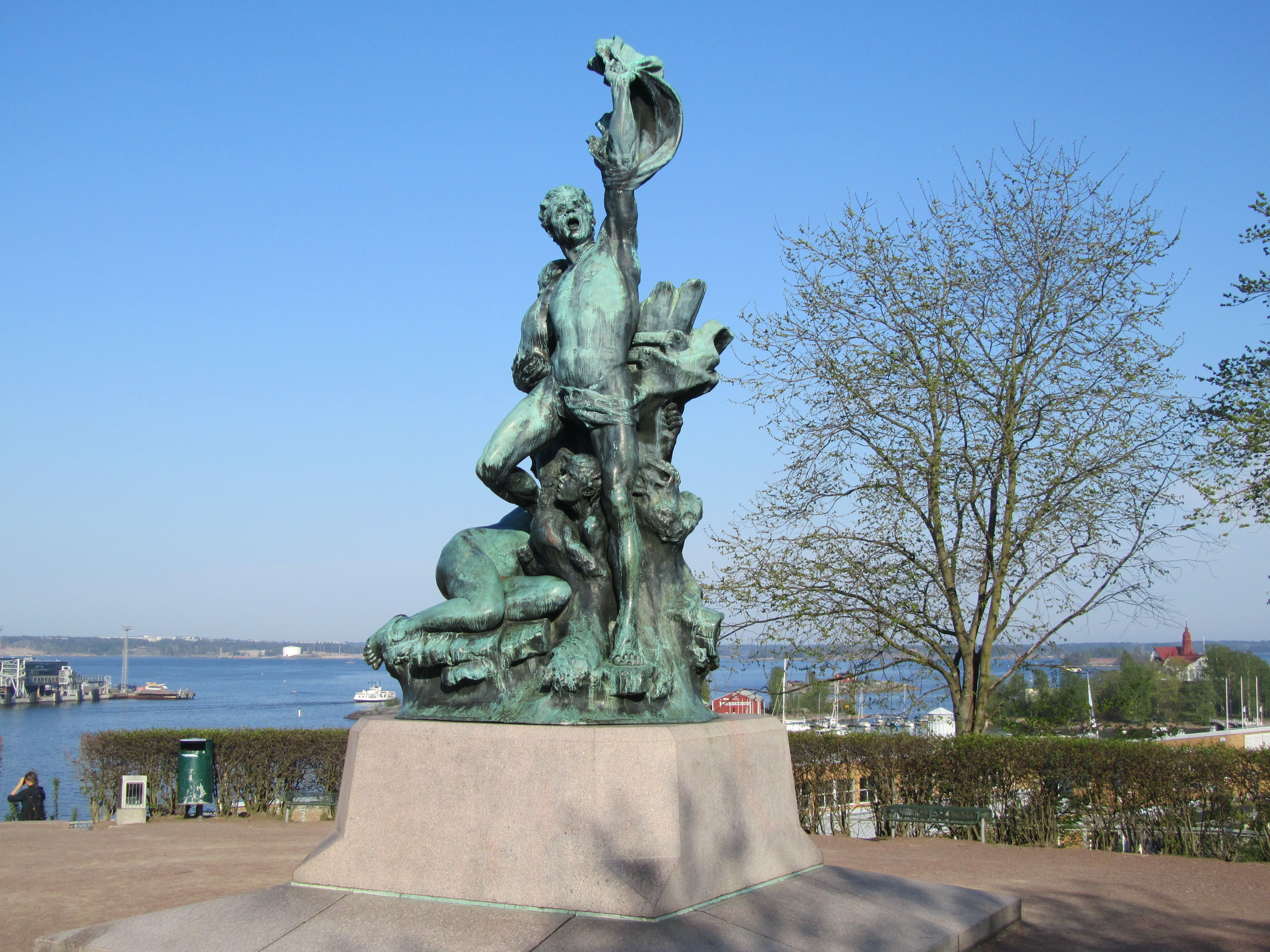
The Shipwrecked sculpture

Tähtitorninvuori or Tähtitorninmäki (Swedish: Observatorieberget/Observatoriebacken; lit. '"Observatory Hill"') is a rocky hill about 30 meters high in Ullanlinna, Helsinki, next to the South Harbor. The hill is mostly a park, but there are also a few public buildings.

At the top of the hill, at the southern end of Unioninkatu, is the Helsinki University Observatory, which was completed in 1834 and is named after the observatory towers. Today, the Observatory serves as a public center for astronomy and is not used for research purposes. Astronomical observations there can no longer be made because the city lights completely obscure the dim objects in the starry sky. Researchers can make observations e.g. In Metsähovi in Kirkkonummi or abroad.

In the past, the observatory was clearly visible as the end point of the long and straight Unioninkatu, up to Kallio Church, but today the trees growing on both sides of Copernicus Road almost obscure it from view.

Robert Stigell's sculpture Shipwrecked (Haaksirikkoiset) from 1897 is located on the edge of the park on the South Harbor side, on a plateau above a high cliff.
