= The Bells of Kallio Church =

Chorale by Jean Sibelius (1912)

- Chorale by Jean Sibelius
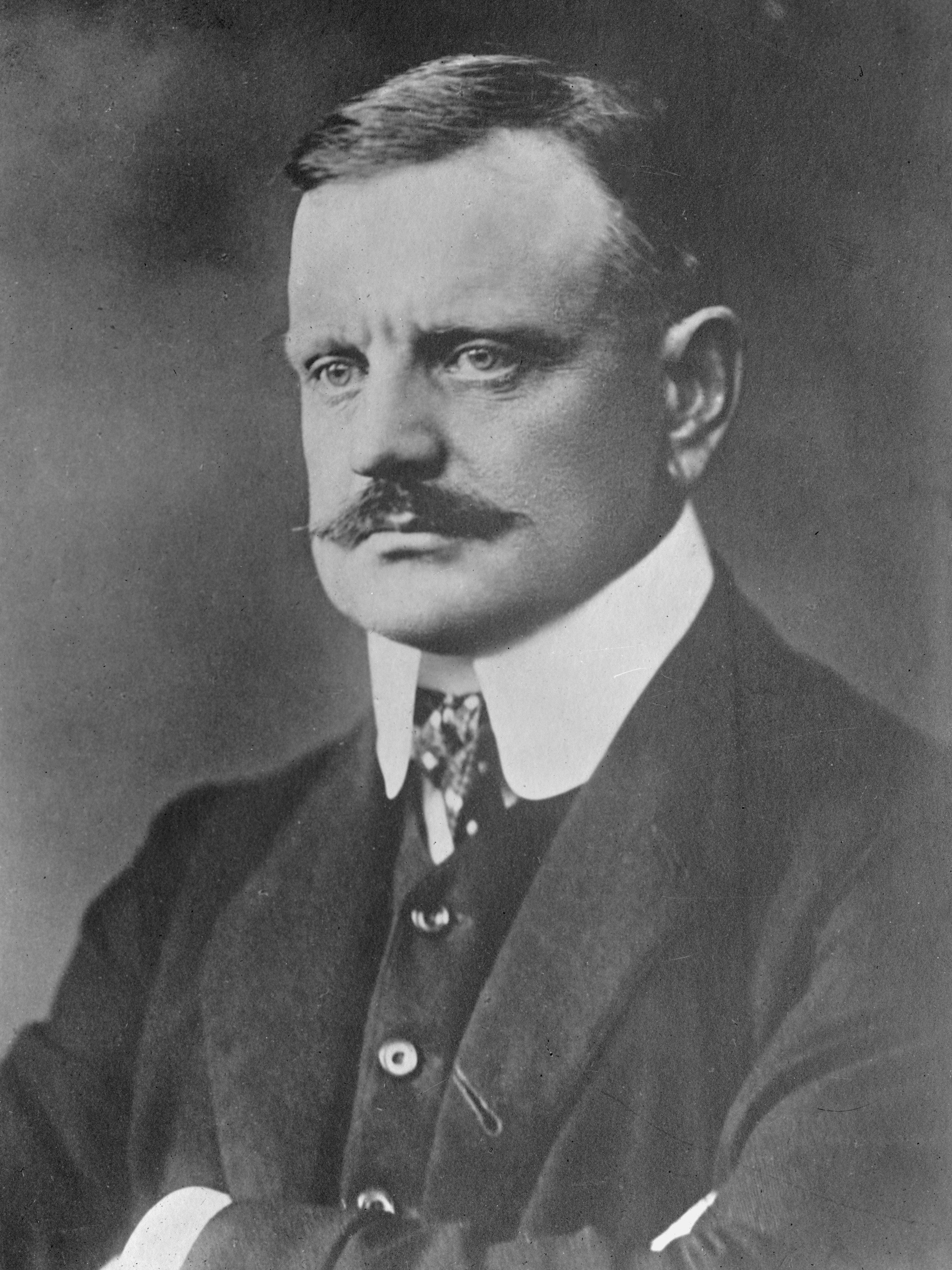
- The composer in 1912
- Native name: Kallion kirkon kellosävel
- Catalogue: JS 102 (carillon)
- Opus: 65b (piano, SATB)
- Text: "Päättyy työ, joutuu yö" by Heikki Klemetti (SATB)
- Composed: 1912, arr. 1912 (piano; SATB)
- Duration: Approx. 2 mins.

Premiere
- Date: 1 September 1912
- Location: Helsinki, Grand Duchy of Finland
- Performers: The carillon of Kallio Church

The Bells of Kallio Church (in Finnish: Kallion kirkon kellosävel; in Swedish: Klockmelodin i Berghälls kyrka; lit. ''The Bell Melody of Kallio Church''), JS 102 (arrangements as Op. 65b) is a brief chorale for mechanized carillon written in 1912 by the Finnish composer Jean Sibelius. The piece, which the titular institution commissioned, sounds twice daily—at noon and 18 o'clock—in Helsinki on four of the seven German-made, bronze church bells in the brick-and-granite steeple. As such, it is the most frequently performed composition in Sibelius's oeuvre, as well as a notable part of the capital's soundscape.

The piece premiered on 1 September 1912 in Helsinki at the Kallio Church's consecration ceremony. For this occasion, the Finnish choral master Heikki Klemetti arranged the chorale (without Sibelius's blessing) for mixed choir a cappella, to a poem by Julius Engström, the priest of the new church. Klemetti's intrusion confused the Finnish press: some newspapers mistakenly credited both men for the tune, while others omitted Sibelius's name entirely. To reclaim sole artistic ownership, Sibelius arranged The Bells of Kallio Church for solo piano a few days after the ceremony, while on 13 September he supplanted Klemetti's arrangement with his own for mixed choir—settling, ironically, for new lyrics penned by Klemetti.

== History ==
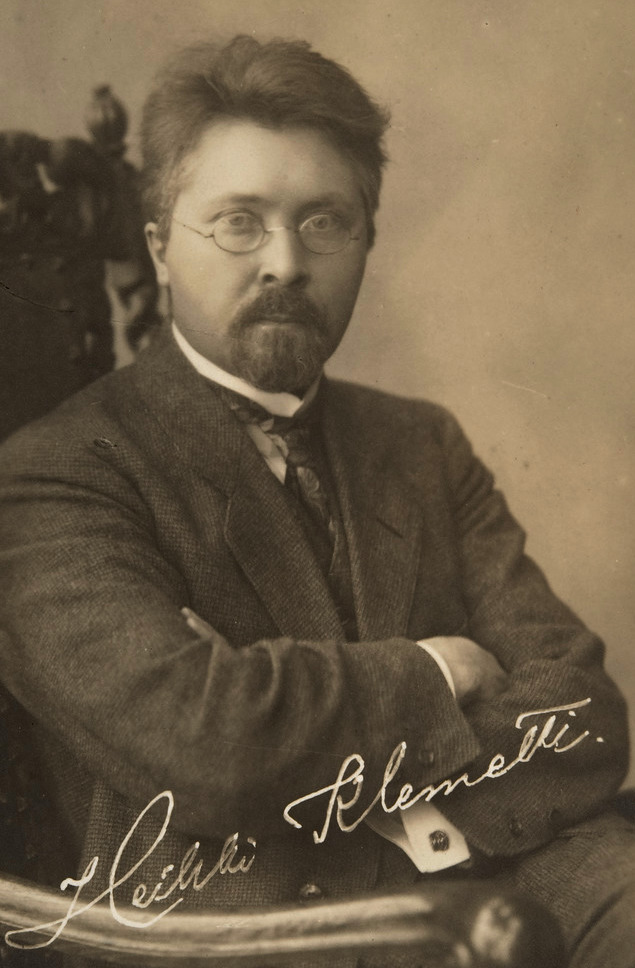
Heikki Klemetti arranged the chorale without permission.

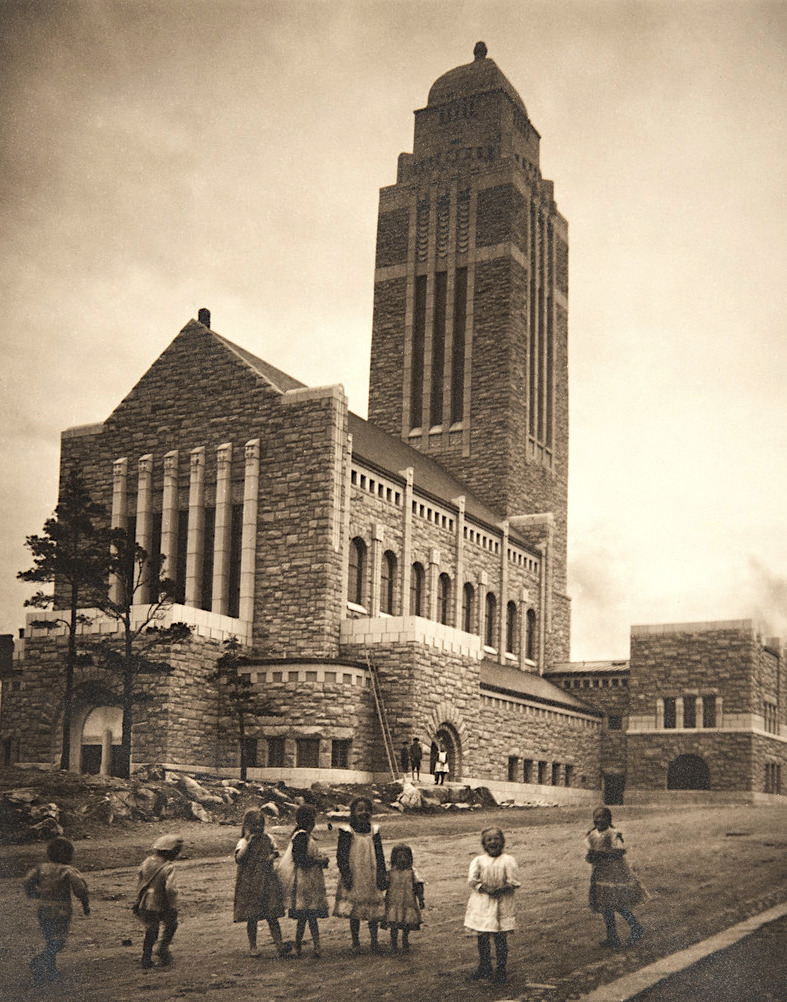
Helsinki's Kallio Church in the year of its inauguration (1912)

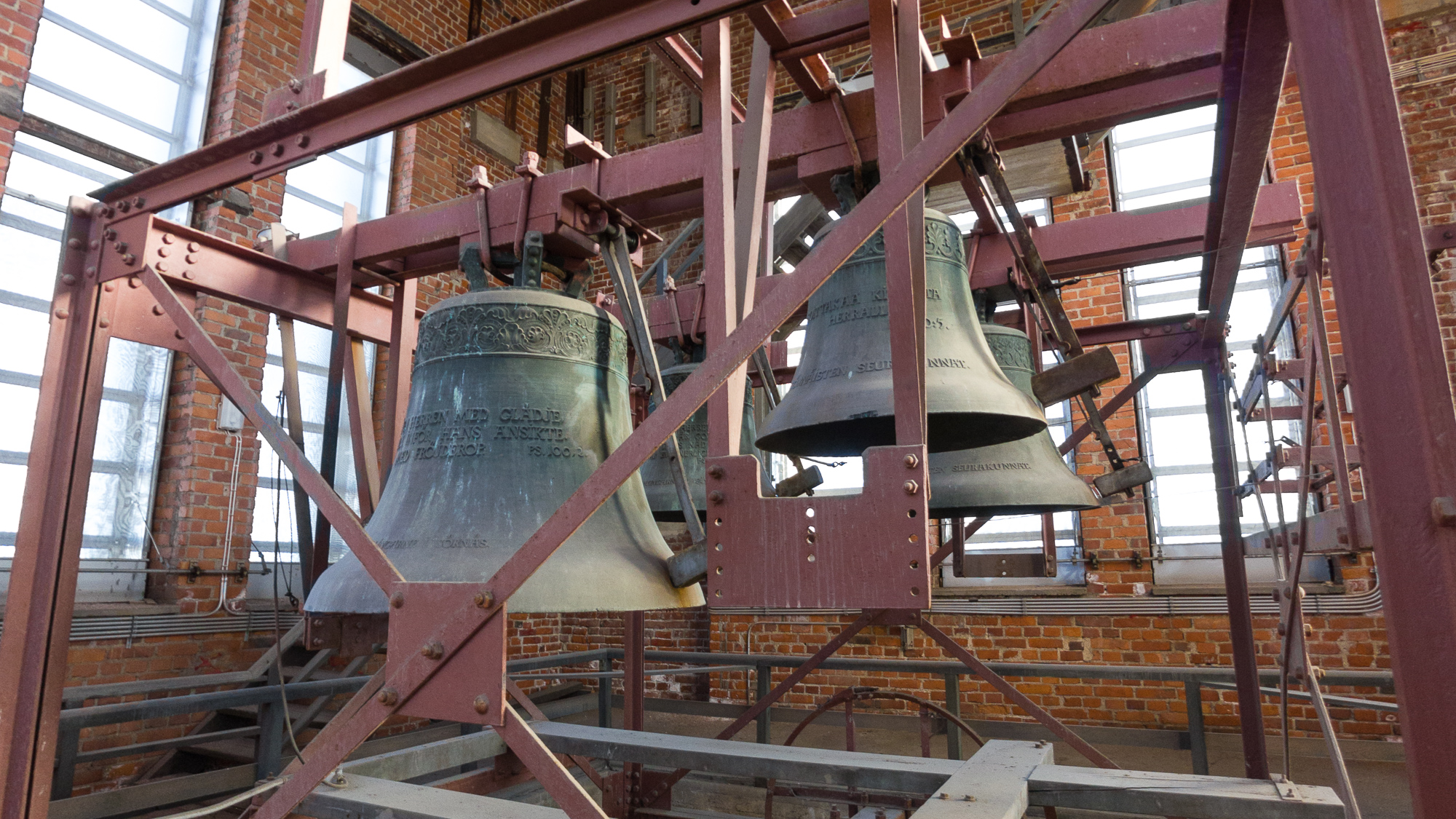
The church contains seven bronze church bells in its steeple, four of which are utilized in Sibelius's piece.

On 13 July 1908, construction began on a new Lutheran church in the Kallio subdistrict of Helsinki; the Finnish architect Lars Sonck designed the building, which stylistically incorporates both national romantic and Art Nouveau influences. The steeple of Kallio Church contains a carillon of seven bronze church bells (pitched D♯^{1} to C♯^{2} and weighing a total of 4,800 kilograms), which were commissioned from the celebrated Apolda-based, German clockmaker Franz Schilling & Söhne; the clock and playing drum mechanism, in turn, was built by Bokelmann & Kuhlo.

In 1910, Sibelius broke off work on the Fourth Symphony (1911) to hold discussions with the church's building committee, which hoped the composer would provide a melody for the mechanized carillon. Sibelius accepted the offer, and even consulted—along with the Finnish composers Oskar Merikanto and Ilmari Krohn—on the make and pitching of the bells. By January 1911, however, Sibelius had still not settled on a melody, although he toyed with the idea of using the last few measures from his Second Symphony (1902).

The Bells of Kallio Church premiered on Sunday, 1 September 1912. For this occasion, the Finnish choral master Heikki Klemetti arranged the chorale (without Sibelius's blessing and, thus, to his annoyance) to a poem by Julius Engström, the priest of the new church. Klemetti's intrusion confused the Finnish press: some newspapers credited both men for the tune, while a few others—such as Helsingin Sanomat and Hufvudstadsbladet—omitted Sibelius's name entirely.

"Klemetti's attempt at the bell tune for the inauguration annoyed me", Sibelius confided in his diary. "I was furious but, after a couple of hours, became wholly indifferent to his impudence".

Sibelius, in a move intended to reclaim sole artistic ownership of The Bells of Kallio Church, arranged the piece for solo piano a few days after the consecration; on 13 September, he supplanted Klemetti's arrangement with his own for mixed choir a cappella. Sibelius sold both arrangements in October to the Leipzig-based music publisher Breitkopf & Härtel. According to the musicologist Sakari Ylivuori, an authority on Sibelius's choral music, the autograph manuscript of the arrangement for mixed choir contains no text underlaid, apparently because Sibelius had disliked Engström's "mediocre" poem and had hoped that the Finnish poet Otto Manninen would contribute a new text. In the end, Sibelius settled—ironically—for a new lyrics penned by Klemetti, which Breitkopf received on 17 December.

== Music ==
The original for carillon, corresponding to measures 1–8 in the piano arrangement (with tubular bells as the midi-instrument)
Measures 1–8 from the piano arrangement
Measures 1–8 from the choral arrangement (with harp as the midi-instrument)

== Discography ==
The table below lists commercially available recordings of the piano arrangement of The Bells of Kallio Church:

Pianist	Runtimes (Note: All runtimes are official, as printed on CD or LP liner notes.)	Rec. (Note: Refers to the year in which the performers recorded the work; this may not be the same as the year in which the recording was first released to the general public.)	Recording venue	Label	Ref.
Erik T. Tawaststjerna	3:22	1987	Danderyd Grammar School	BIS	(Note: E. Tawaststjerna—BIS (CD–367) 1987)
Annette Servadei	2:44	1994	St George's Church, Brandon Hill	Alto	(Note: A. Servadei—Alto (ALC1378) 2018)
Eero Heinonen	3:34	1999	YLE M2 Studio	Finlandia	(Note: E. Heinonen—Finlandia (8573–80775–2) 2000)
Folke Gräsbeck	4:00	2009	Kuusankoski Hall	BIS	(Note: F. Gräsbeck—BIS (CD–1927/29) 2009)

The table below lists commercially available recordings of the choral arrangement of The Bells of Kallio Church:

Ensemble	Conductor	Runtimes	Rec.	Recording venue	Label	Ref.						
Ensemble	Conductor	Jubilate Choir	Rec.	Recording venue	Label	Ref.	Astrid Riska	2:17	1996	Danderyds gymnasium	BIS	(Note: Jubilate Choir—BIS (CD–825) 1996)
Tapiola Chamber Choir	Hannu Norjanen	2:51	1997	Roihuvuori Church	Finlandia	(Note: Tapiola Chamber Choir—Finlandia (0630–19054–2) 1998)						
Estonian Philharmonic Chamber Choir	Heikki Seppanen	2:20	2014	Järvenpää Hall	Ondine	(Note: Estonian Phil. Chamber Choir—Ondine (ODE 1260–2D) 2015)						

In addition, Volume 15 of BIS Record's Sibelius Edition (CD–1936/38) includes the released—originally recorded by Finlandia Records (0630–19054–2) in the spring of 1996—of JS 102, played on the carillon of Kallio Church. (Note: Volume 15 of BIS Record's Sibelius Edition also includes the world premiere recording (two versions, respectively in D-flat major and G-flat major) of the Second Symphony's concluding bars, which Sibelius had proposed to the church commission on 18 January 1911. The Sibelius biographer and project advisor Andrew Barnett plays the two drafts on the glockenspiel (manuscript HUL 1209 at the Library of the University of Helsinki.))

== Notes, references, and sources ==
=== Sources ===
- Barnett, Andrew (2007). Sibelius. New Haven, Connecticut: Yale University Press. ISBN 978-0-300-16397-1.
- Barnett, Andrew (2011). The Sibelius Edition, Vol. XIII: Miscellaneous Works (CD booklet). BIS. CD–1936/38.
- Dahlström, Fabian [in Swedish] (2003). Jean Sibelius: Thematisch-bibliographisches Verzeichnis seiner Werke [Jean Sibelius: A Thematic Bibliographic Index of His Works] (in German). Wiesbaden: Breitkopf & Härtel. ISBN 3-7651-0333-0.
- Valsta, Heikki (2 February 2015). "Sibelius soi kirkonkelloissa" [Sibelius rings the church bells]. yle.fi. Finnish Broadcasting Company.
- Ylivuori, Sakari, ed. (2021). "Vorwort/ Preface". Sibelius: Two Part-Songs for Mixed Choir a cappella, Op. 65 (Urtext) (in German and English). Breitkopf & Härtel. ISMN 979-0-004-41303-6. ChB 5373.
