= Unioninkatu =

Street in central Helsinki, Finland

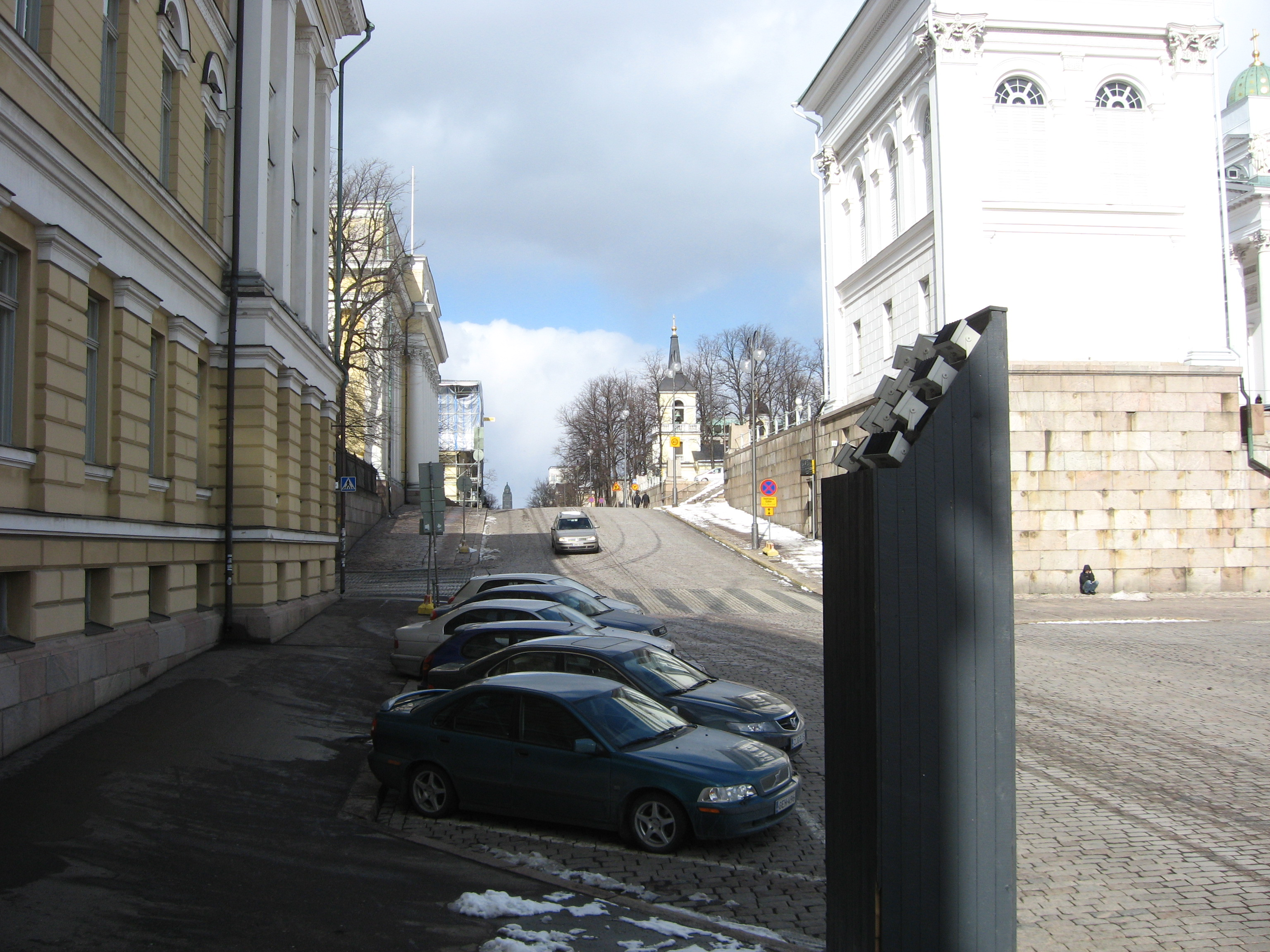
Unioninkatu viewed to the north from the Senate Square. On the left are the main building of the University of Helsinki and the Finnish National Library, on the right are the towers of the Helsinki Cathedral and the Holy Trinity Church. The tower of the Kallio Church is located at the northern end.

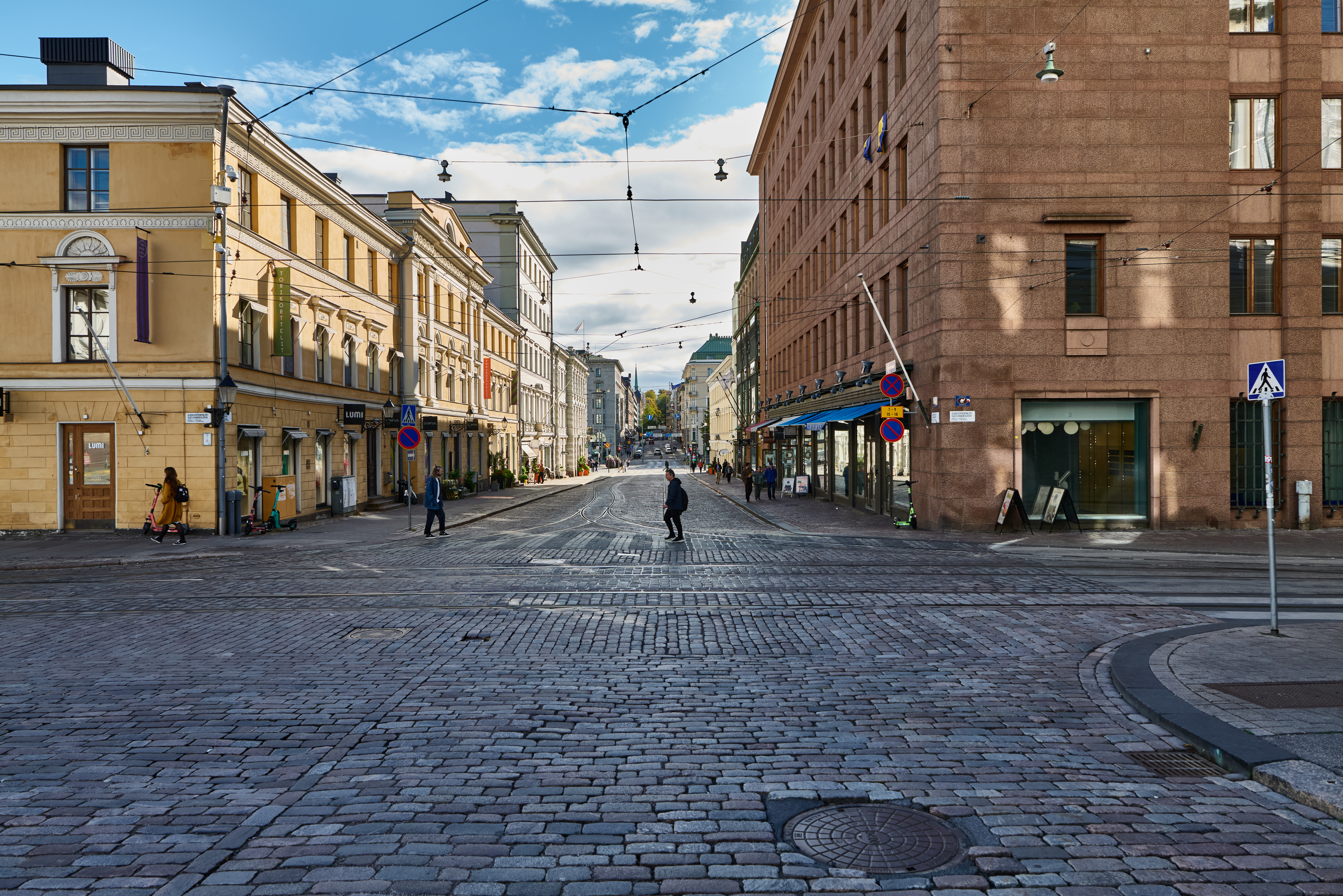
Unioninkatu viewed to the south towards Kaartinkaupunki: the intersection of Unioninkatu and Aleksanterinkatu to the southwest of the Senate Square.

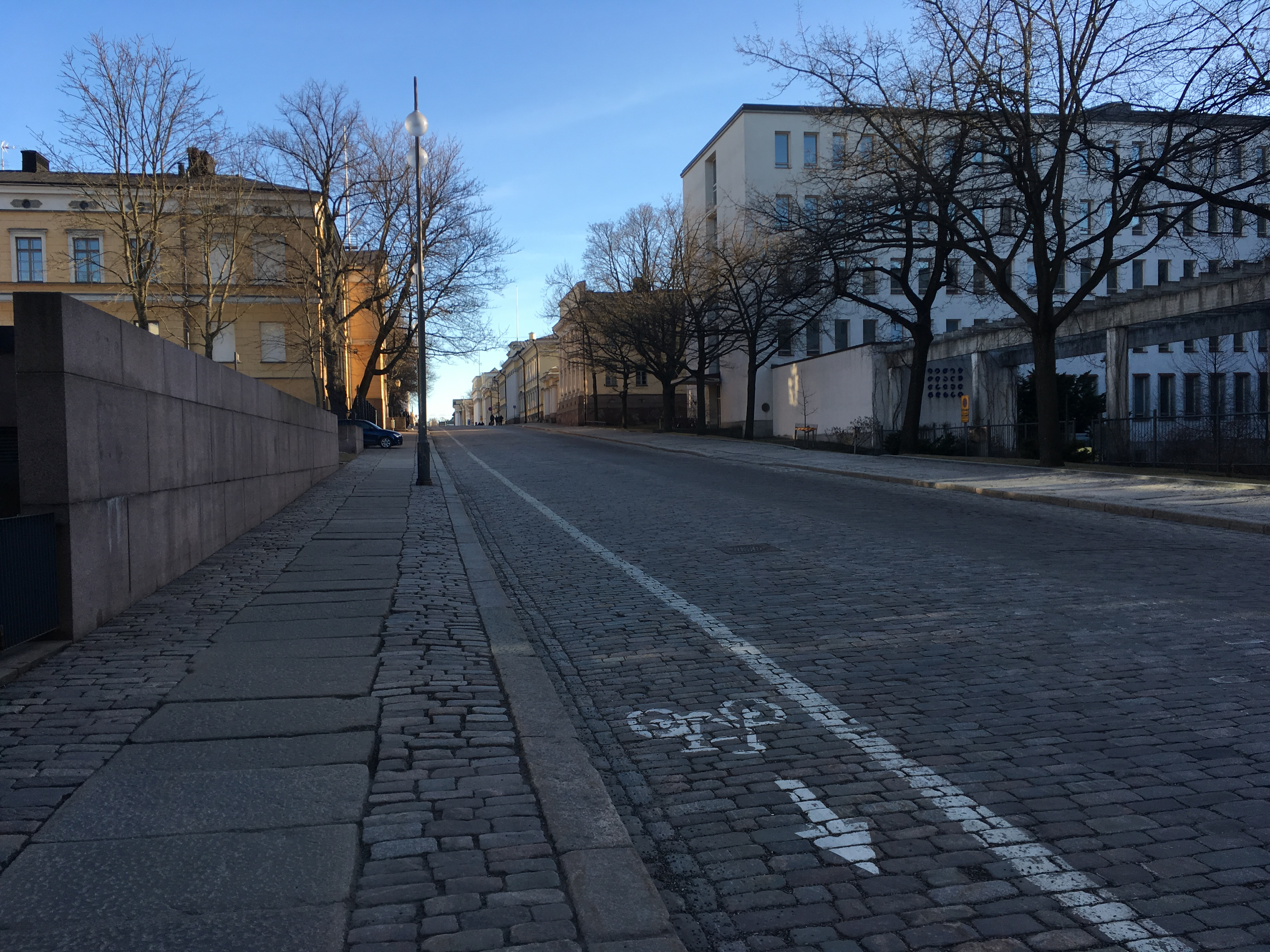
Unioninkatu viewed to the south at Metsätalo.

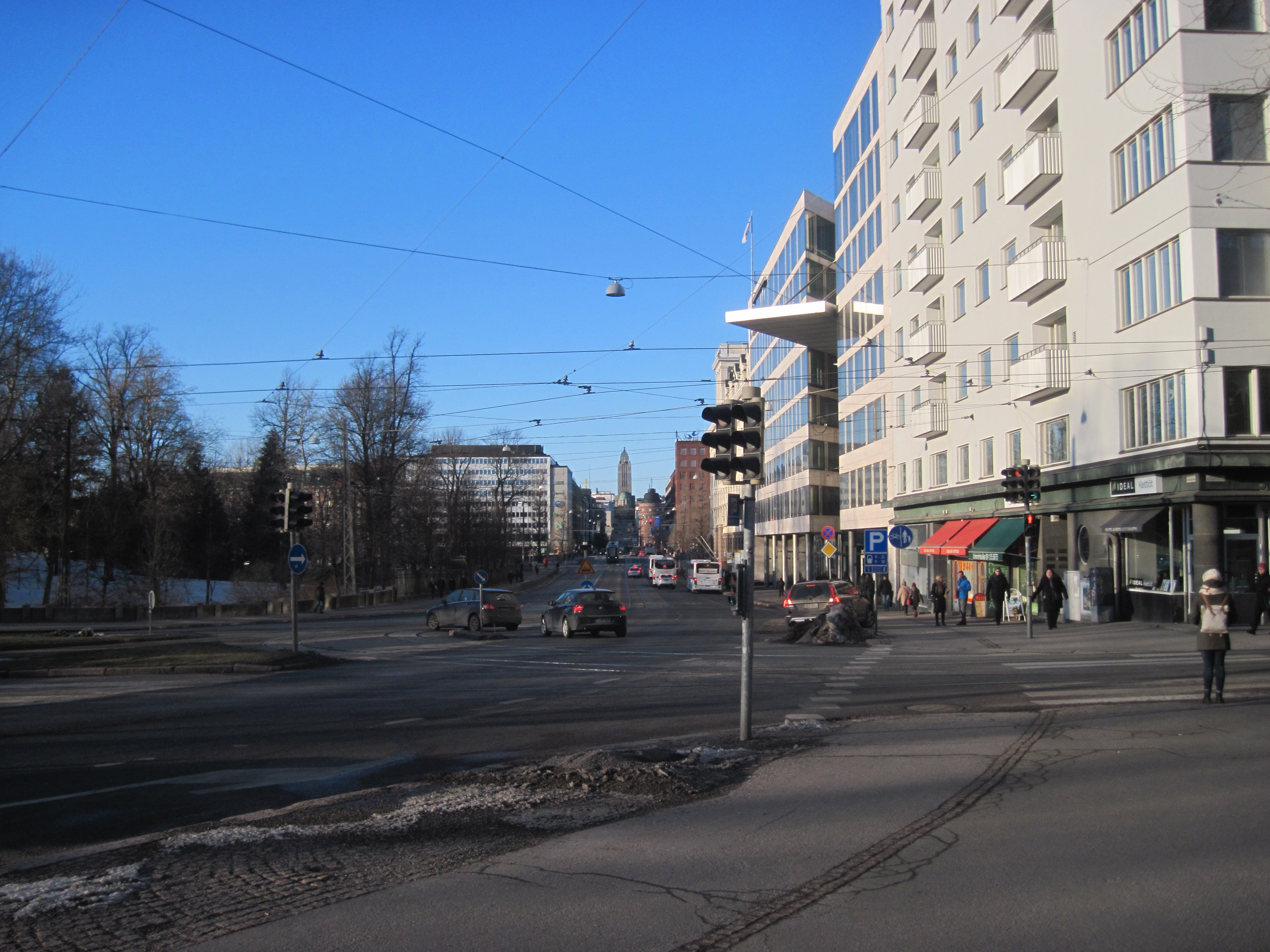
The northern end of Unioninkatu viewed towards the Kallio Church from the Kaisaniemi roundabout. On the left are the Kaisaniemi Park and the Kaisaniemi botanical gardens.

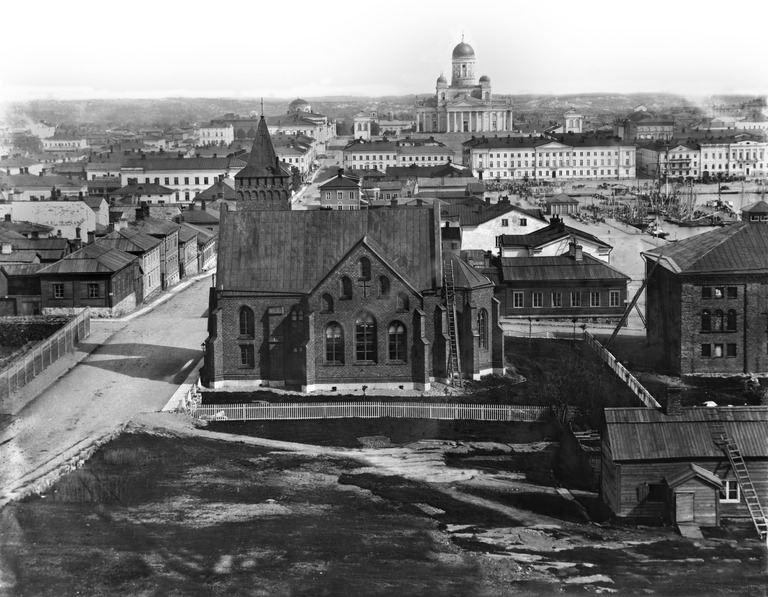
Eugen Hoffers, view from Ulrikanporinvuori (now known as Tähtitorninvuori) to the north, on the left is Unioninkatu, in the middle is the German Church in Helsinki, 1867. Picture from the City Museum of Helsinki.

Unioninkatu (Swedish: Unionsgatan, both meaning "Union Street") is one of the key streets in the historic centre of Helsinki, Finland. It stretches from the Tähtitorninvuori hill to the Pitkäsilta bridge and is about 1.5 km long. Its southern part is located in Kaartinkaupunki up to the Esplanadi park, while the northern part acts as the border between Kruununhaka to the east and Kluuvi to the west. The street functions as a local assembly street.

In the south, Unioninkatu is directly continued by the short street Kopernikuksentie leading to the gate of the Helsinki University Observatory. In the north, Unioninkatu is directly continued after the Pitkäsilta bridge by the street Siltasaarenkatu leading to the Kallio Church. Together these three streets form a 2.5 km long street line called Unioninakseli, the longest continuous straight street line in central Helsinki.

The northern end of Unioninkatu from the Kaisaniemi roundabout to Pitkäsilta is a busy traffic route, and forms a part of a road leading to Hakaniemi and then to Hämeentie together with Kaisaniemenkatu and Siltasaarenkatu. Many tram lines and all bus lines traveling from the Rautatientori square to the northern and northeastern parts of Helsinki and towards eastern Vantaa run along it. This part of Unioninkatu is a bit wider than the rest of the street and contains a gate leading to the Kaisaniemi botanical gardens.

== History ==
The middle part of Unioninkatu, approximately located between the Helsinki Market Square and the Senate Square, was already present in the 17th century after the city of Helsinki had been moved to the Vironniemi peninsula. At that time it was named Västra Kyrkogatan (Läntinen Kirkkokatu, meaning "Western Church Street") as it ran past of the Ulrika Eleonora Church that was still present at the time. At that time the street leading north from the centre, to the present-day street Hämeentie, was located a bit further east, partly at the location of the present-day street Snellmaninkatu and had many curves.

When Johan Albrecht Ehrenström made a new zoning plan for Helsinki that had been chosen as the new capital of Finland in 1812, Unioninkatu became a key street running straight from Pitkäsilta to the south, to the Ulriikanporinvuori hill, now known as Tähtitorninvuori. An astronomical observatory was later built at the southern end of the street. The street got its name when emperor Alexander I of Russia visited Helsinki in 1819 and arrived in the city on this street. At that time the Helsinki city council proposed naming the street Aleksanterinkatu in his honour and also naming one of the streets leading east from it Elisabetinkatu in honour of his wife Elizabeth. However, the emperor decreed that it should be named Unioninkatu in honour of the union between Finland and Russia as agreed at the Diet of Porvoo. The emperor did accept the name Elisabetinkatu, and the street still bears the Swedish name Elisabetsgatan to this day, however its Finnish name has now been changed to Liisankatu. The name Aleksanterinkatu was later given to one of the streets running across Unioninkatu in 1833.

In the early days of Finnish independence, there were requests to change the name Unioninkatu. Suggestions for a new name included Itsenäisyydenkatu ("Independence Street") and Yliopistonkatu ("University Street"). Regardless of this, the name was not changed.

The part of Unioninkatu between the Market Square and the Senate Square was the most prominent commercial street in Helsinki in the late 19th century. The Stockmann department store was located on the street in the so-called Kiseleff House, which later contained only offices, but which now hosts a shopping centre.

== 2024 rename proposal ==
In May 2024, Dimitri Qvintus, an assistant to the Prime Ministers Antti Rinne and Sanna Marin proposed renaming Unioninkatu to "Euroopan unionin katu" ("European Union Street"). According to Qvintus, Russia is now a criminal state engaged in an illegal war, so the union between Finland and Russia that the street was named after no long exists. Qvintus also explained that other streets in Helsinki have also changed names, such as Mannerheimintie which was previously named Läntinen Viertotie and Heikinkatu before that.

== Buildings ==
Buildings on the southern part of Unioninkatu along the Tähtitorninvuori park include the German Church in Helsinki and the Svenska normallyceum i Helsingfors school. The Helsinki Market Square is bordered by Unioninkatu to the west, and the street separates it from the Esplanadi park. Slightly to the north Unioninkatu also runs along the western edge of the Senate Square, where the main building of the University of Helsinki is located on the street. Between the Senate Square and the Kaisaniemi roundabout there are only public office buildings on the street, of which most were designed by Carl Ludvig Engel. Immediately to the north of the Senate Square are the Finnish National Library and the Helsinki Cathedral located opposite each other, with the proper main entrance to the cathedral actually located on Unioninkatu, not at the Senate Square. The Orthodox Holy Trinity Church is located to the north of the cathedral. After this there are hospital buildings on either side of Unioninkatu, including Topelia and the Old and New Clinics, which are now in use of the university and form part of the City Centre Campus. The Metsätalo building of the university is also located on Unioninkatu.

== Perpendicular streets from south to north ==
- Bernhardinkatu
- Eteläinen Makasiinikatu
- Pohjoinen Makasiinikatu
- Eteläesplanadi
  - The Helsinki Market Square is located between Eteläesplanadi and Pohjoisesplanadi to the east of Unioninkatu, while the Esplanadi park is located to the west of it
- Pohjoisesplanadi
- Aleksanterinkatu
  - The Senate Square is located to the east of Unioninkatu, between Aleksanterinkatu and Hallituskatu
- Hallituskatu (to the east), Yliopistonkatu (to the west)
- Kirkkokatu
- Rauhankatu (to the east)
- Yrjö-Koskisen katu, whose part to the east of Unioninkatu is a pedestrian zone
  - The Varsapuistikko park is located between the three streets Unioninkatu, Yrjö-Koskisen katu and Kaisaniemenkatu
- Kaisaniemenkatu (to the southwest), Liisankatu (to the east), with a roundabout at the intersection
  - The Kaisaniemi botanical gardens are located to the west of Unioninkatu at its northern end
- Siltavuorenpenger (to the east)
- Siltavuorenranta (to the east), Kaisaniemenranta (to the west)

== Tram traffic ==
The tram line 2 runs along Unioninkatu from the Senate Square to the Market Square. This part of the street has one-way traffic, with traffic in the opposite direction running along the narrow street Katariinankatu to the east of Unioninkatu.
