= Holy Trinity Church, Helsinki =

Coordinates: 60°10′16.1″N 24°57′04″E

Holy Trinity Church
- Finnish: Pyhän Kolminaisuuden kirkko Swedish: Heliga Treenighetskyrkan; Russian: Храм Пресвятой Троицы
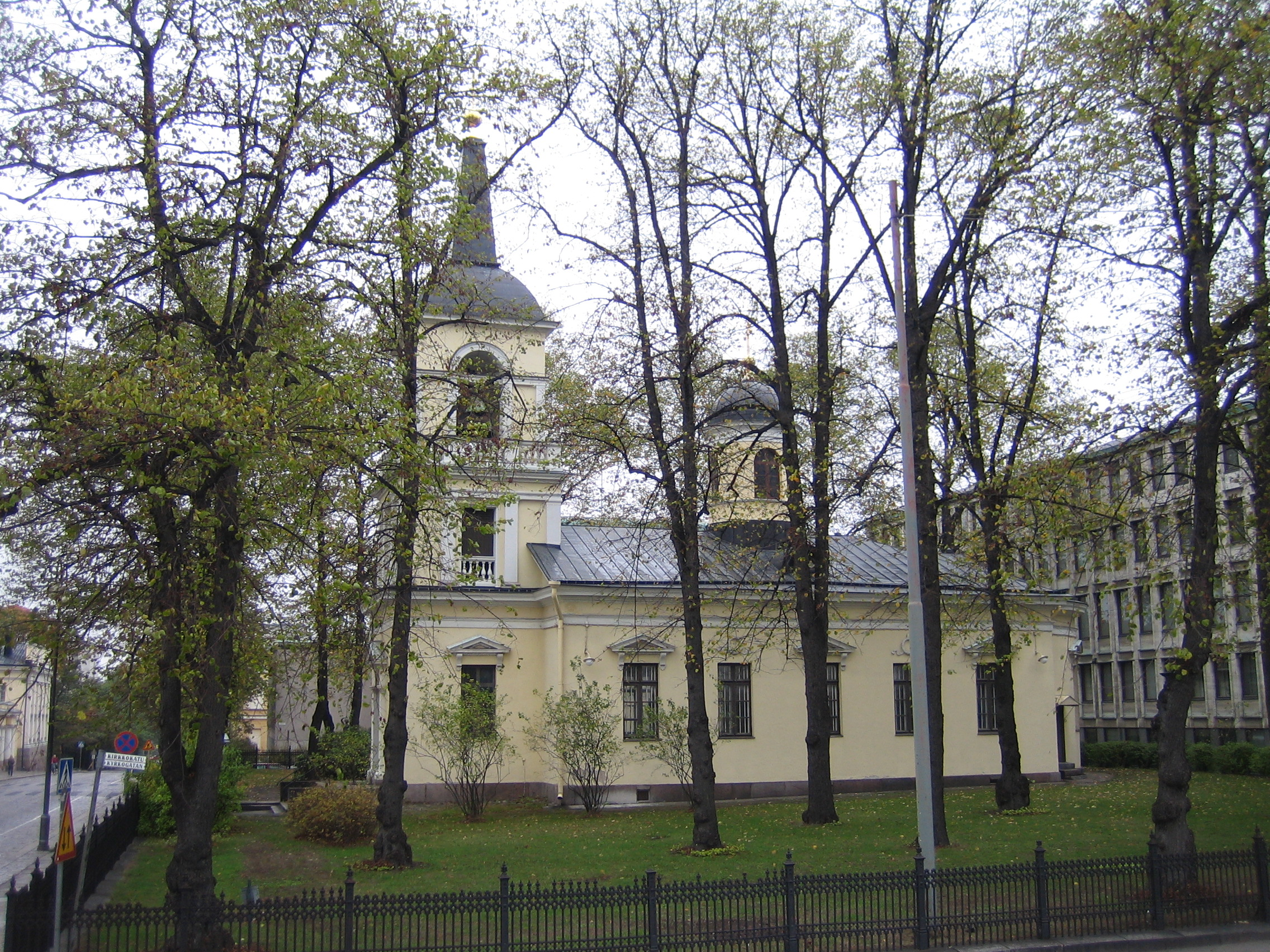
- Holy Trinity Church
- Location: Helsinki
- Country: Finland
- Denomination: Eastern Orthodox
- Website: hos.fi/fi/kolminaisuuden-kirkko

History
- Consecrated: 1827

Architecture
- Functional status: Active
- Architect: Carl Ludvig Engel

Administration
- Diocese: Helsinki
- Parish: Helsinki Orthodox

The Holy Trinity Church (Finnish: Pyhän Kolminaisuuden kirkko, Swedish: Heliga Treenighetskyrkan, Russian: Свято-Троицкая церковь) is a Finnish Orthodox Church located in the Kruununhaka district of Helsinki, on the corner of Unioninkatu and Rauhankatu. The church was built in the neo-classical style in 1826 under the direction of the architect Carl Ludvig Engel, and was dedicated and opened in the following year. The Holy Trinity services the city's orthodox community with Divine Liturgy held in both Church Slavic and Finnish.

The church is Helsinki's oldest Orthodox church. When Finland became the autonomous Grand Duchy of Finland in 1809, a number of Russian civil servants, merchants and soldiers moved to Helsinki. They needed a place for worship, and the czar supported their efforts to get a church. In the 21st century, many of the churchgoers still speak Russian, but majority of them are immigrants born in the Soviet Union.

== Gallery ==
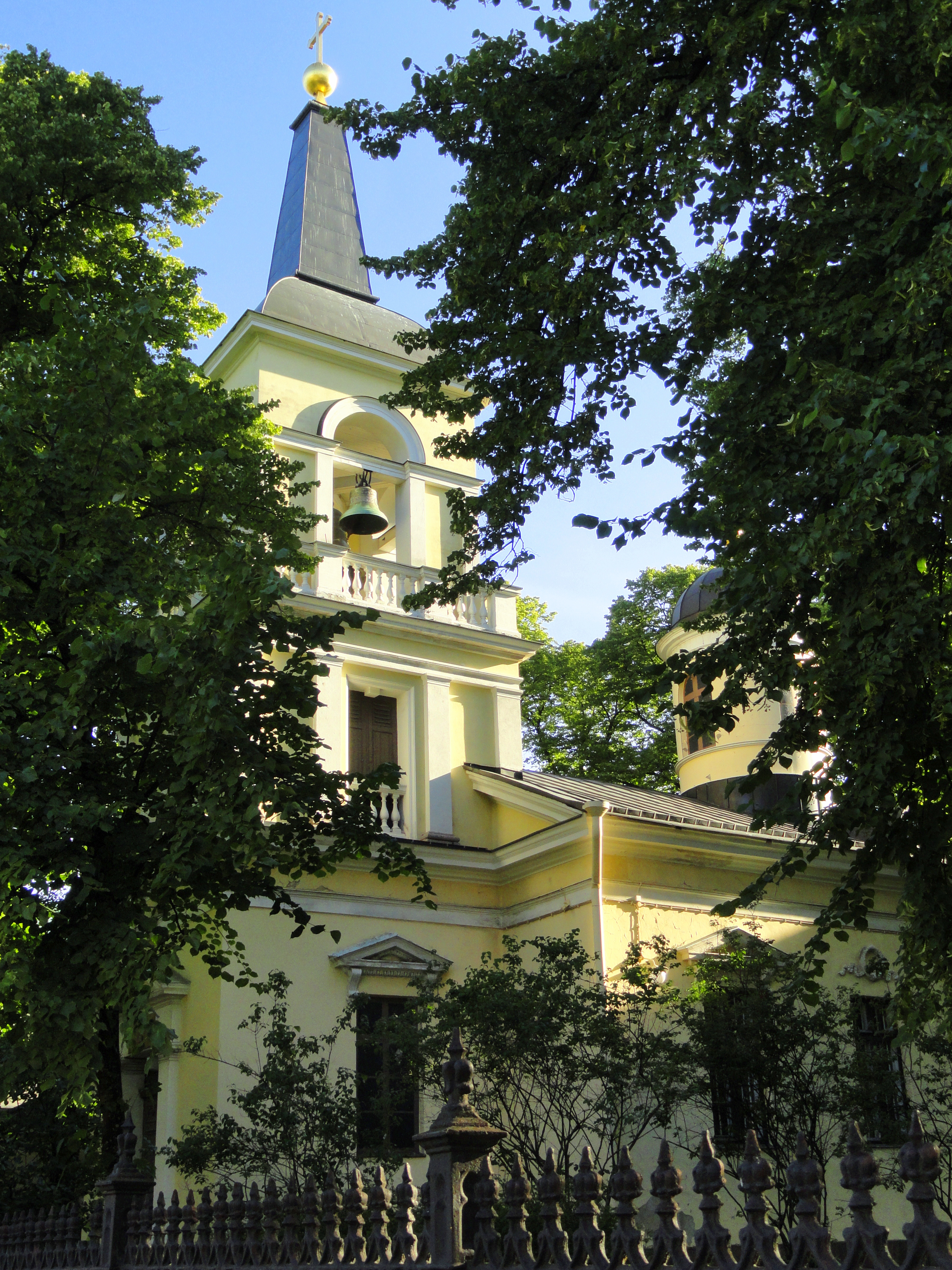
Bell tower

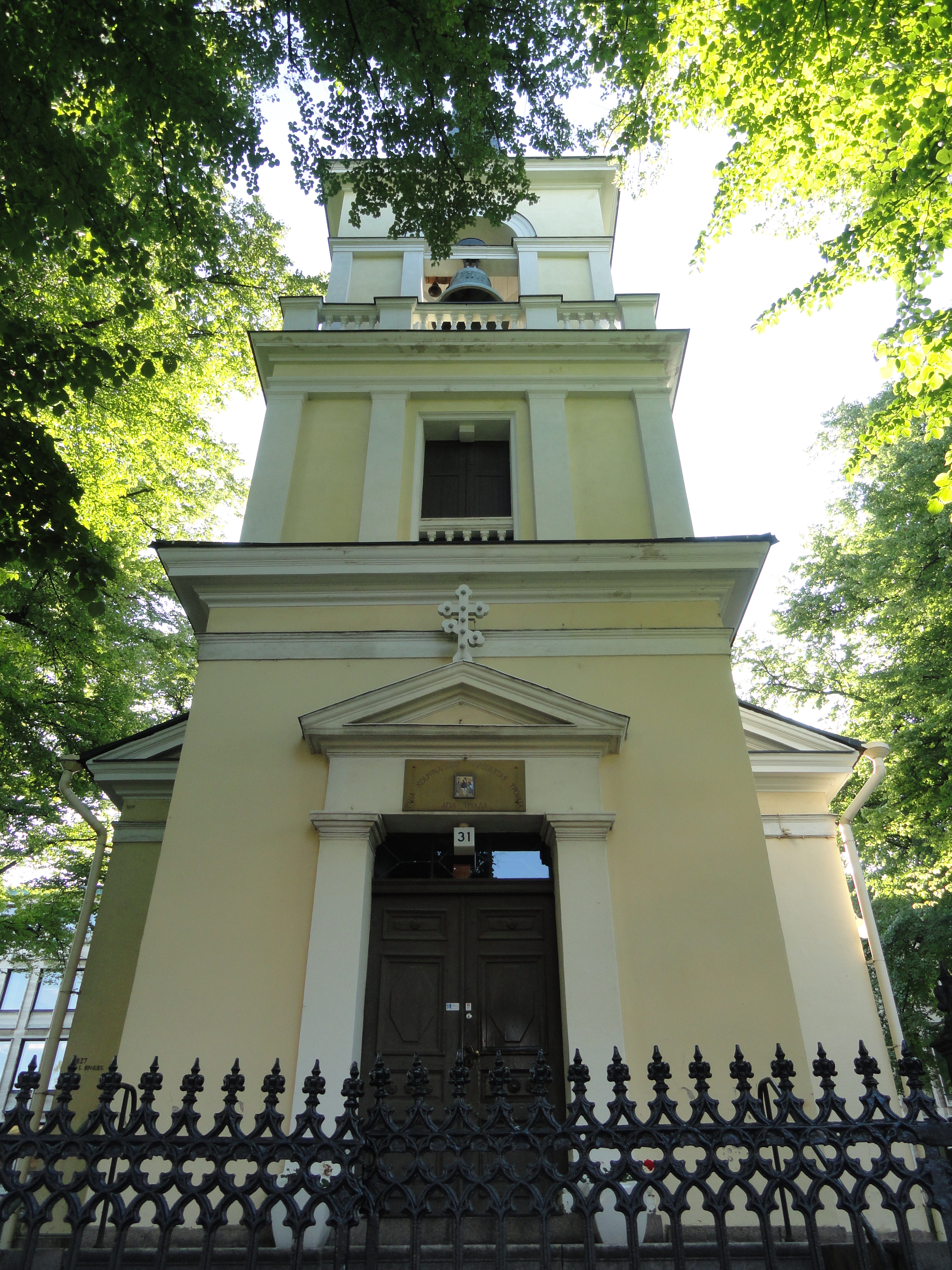
Front

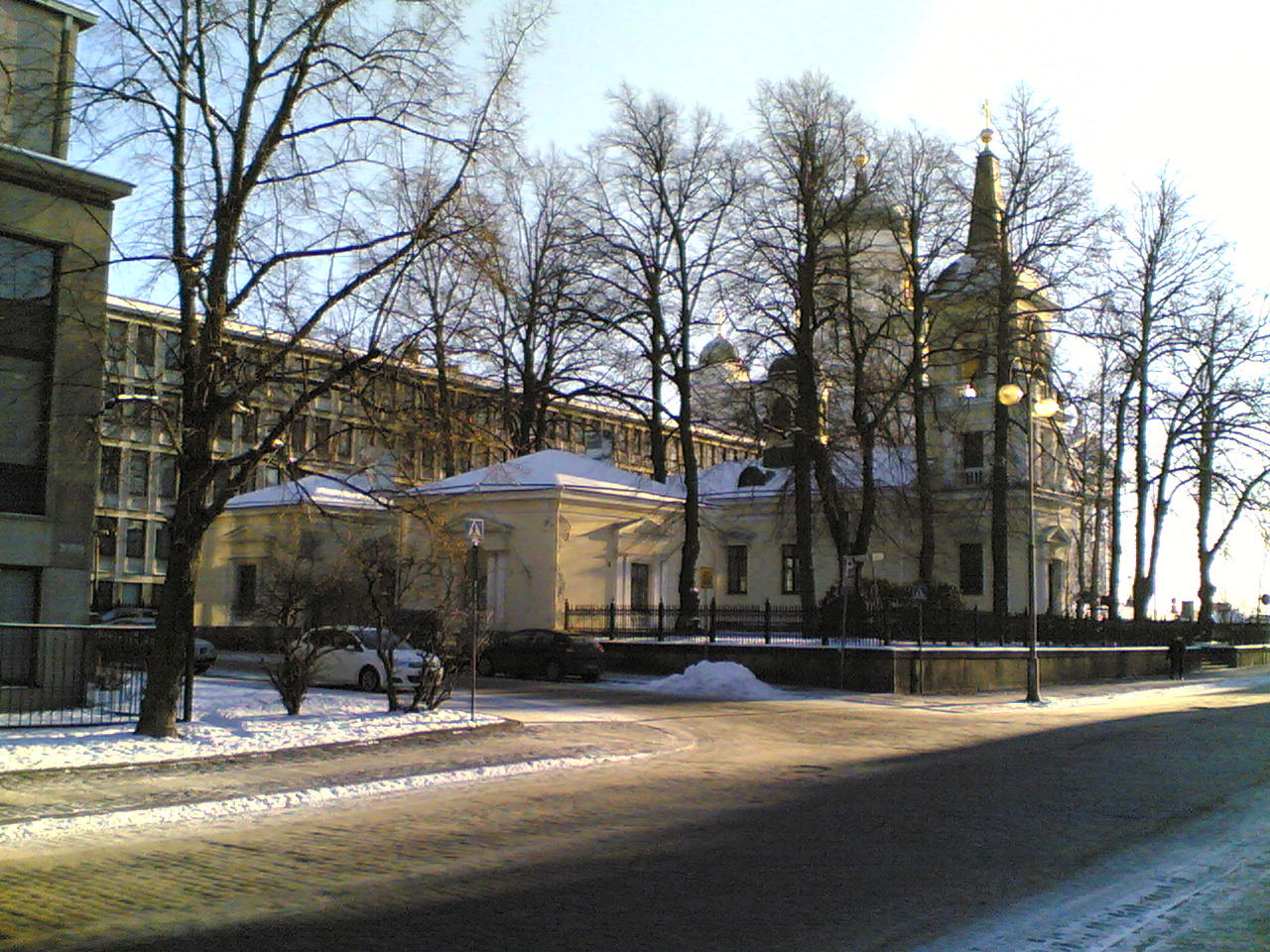
From the northern side, with Helsinki Cathedral in the background

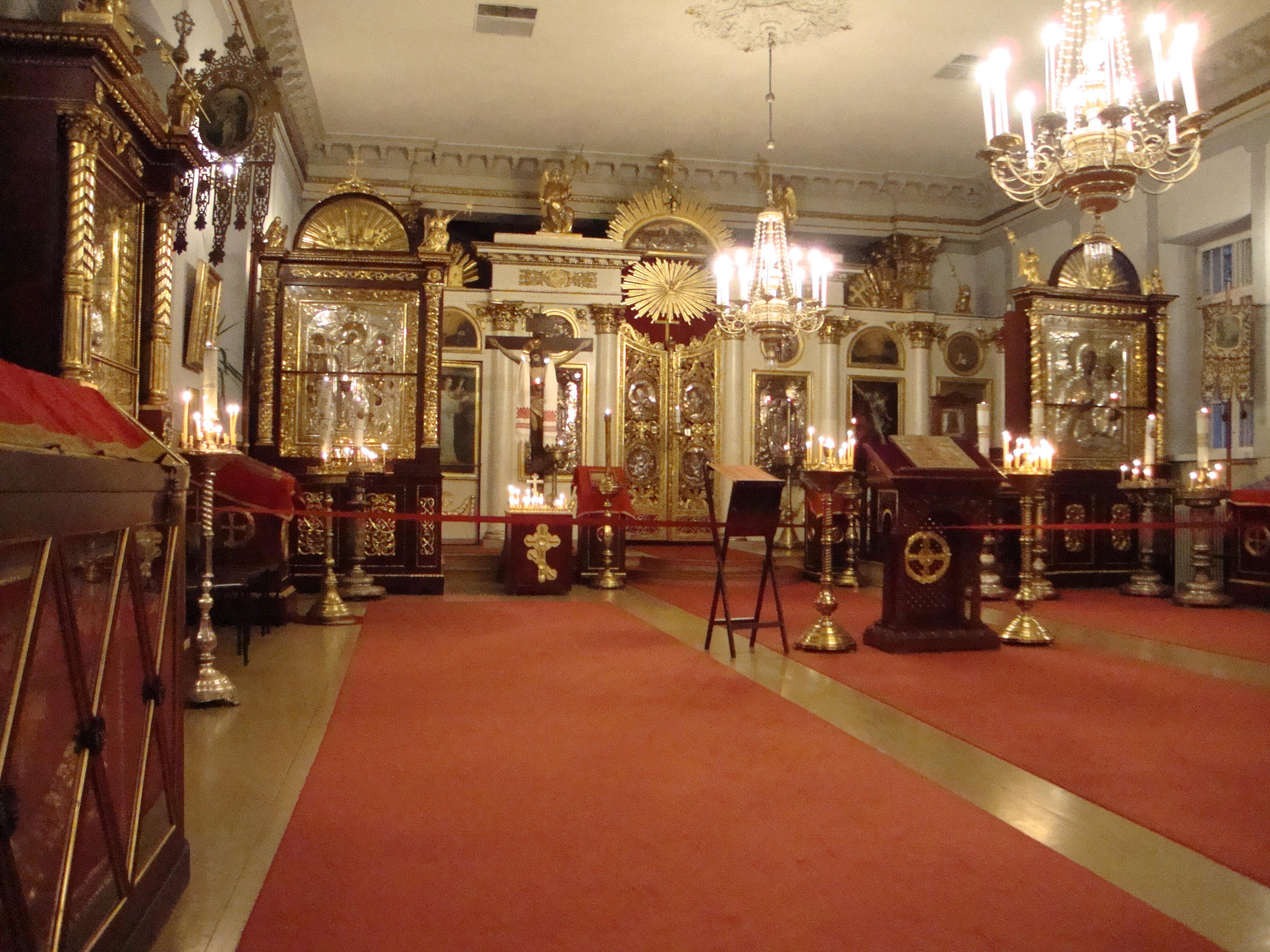
Altar

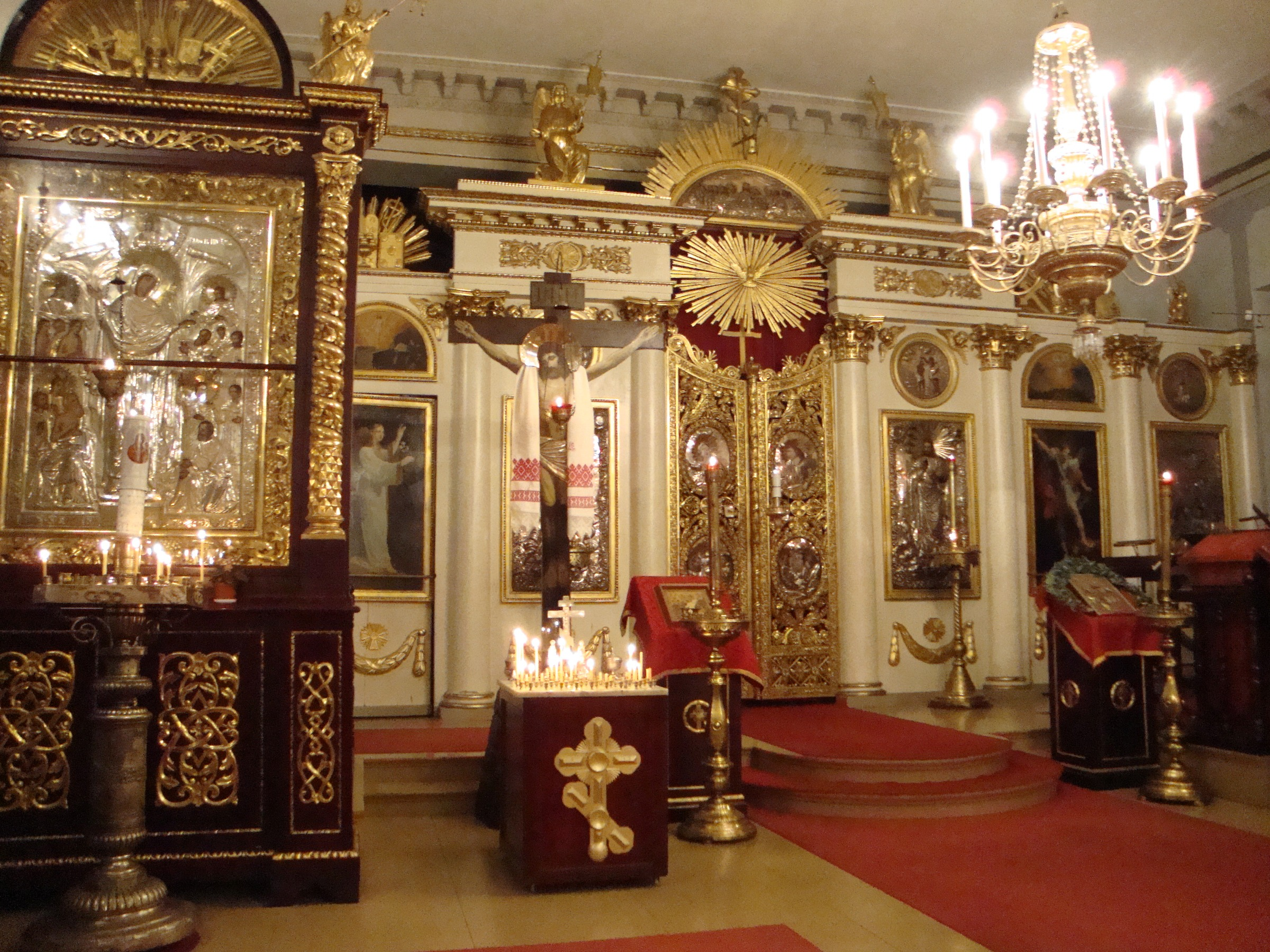
Iconostasis

== See also ==
- Finnish Orthodox Church
- Uspenski Cathedral
