= Kallio Church =

- Finnish: Kallion kirkko Swedish: Berghälls kyrka
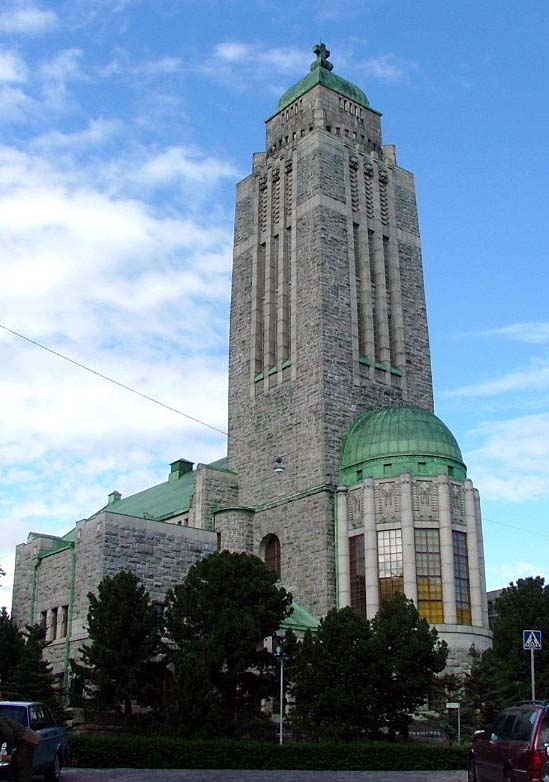
- Kallio Church.
- Kallio Church
- Location: Kallio, Helsinki
- Country: Finland
- Denomination: Lutheran

History
- Status: active

Architecture
- Architect: Lars Sonck
- Architectural type: National Romanticism, Art Nouveau
- Groundbreaking: July 13, 1908
- Completed: 1912

Specifications
- Capacity: 1100

Administration
- Diocese: Diocese of Helsinki
- Parish: Kallio

Kallio Church (Finnish: Kallion kirkko, Swedish: Berghälls kyrka) is a Lutheran church in the Kallio district of Helsinki, Finland. It was designed by Lars Sonck and represents National Romanticism with Art Nouveau influences. The National Romantic style appears in the use of traditional Finnish materials and in the church's massive, gray granite body, as well as in nature-inspired colours and decorative motifs.

Completed in 1912, the church is one of Helsinki's most prominent landmarks. Its excellent acoustics make it a popular venue for concerts, especially for organ music.

== History ==
Construction began on Kallio Church when its foundation stone was laid on July 13, 1908. The church was inaugurated by Bishop Herman Råbergh on September 1, 1912.

In 1917, when Finland was gaining its independence, the Tolstoyan movement adopted the church as their base and preached their message of peace there. During the Second World War there was an air surveillance station in the church tower. Until the 1970s the tower served as a trig point for land surveying.

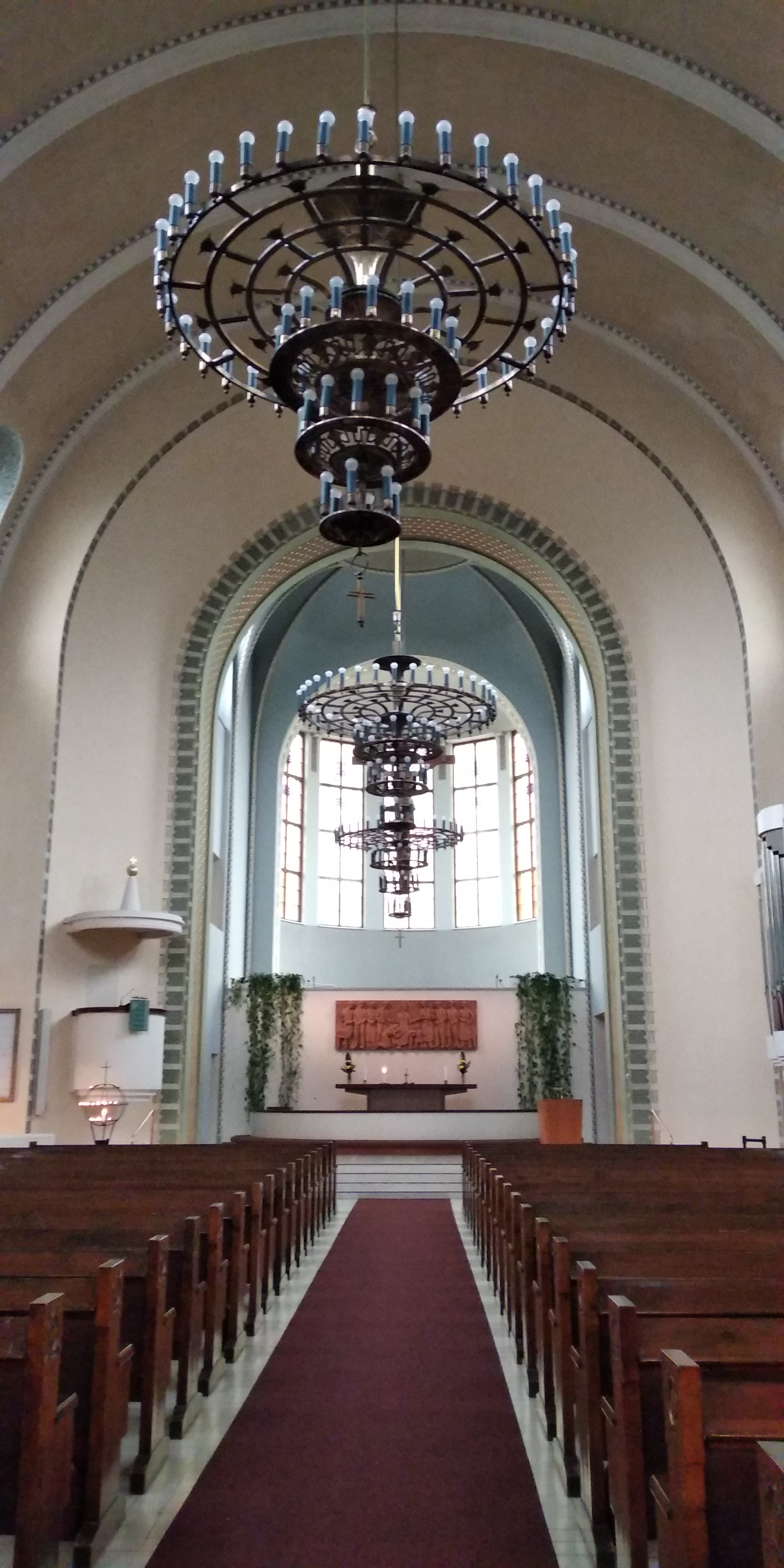
The interior of Kallio Church in Helsinki.

== Description ==
The church is 65 metres high, and its cross is 94 metres above sea level. The Estonian coastline can be seen from the tower. The church is on a hill, and it forms the northern end point of a 2.5 km long street axis made up of three streets, Kopernikuksenkatu, Siltasaarenkatu, and Unioninkatu.

Kallio Church is a hall church with a transept. The load-bearing walls are built of red bricks and clad in Finnish granite. There is seating for 1.100 worshippers.

The interior of the church is decorated with Christian symbols such as roses, lilies, palm branches, laurel crowns and pearls to pass on the message of the Gospels. There are also Art Nouveau murals inside the church. The altarpiece is a wooden relief ‘Tulkaa minun tyköni’ (‘Come to me, all you who are weary and burdened’) by Hannes Autere, carved in 1956. In the vestibule of the church and in the organ galleries there are four plaster reliefs from Sigrid af Forselles’ five-part series Ihmissielun kehitys (‘Development of the human soul’). In the sacristy there's a painting by Verner Thomé, depicting Jesus healing a blind man.

Paavo Tynell designed the massive brass lamps in 1932. The church textiles currently in use are designed by Raija Rastas.

There are seven German bronze bells in the granite tower of the church. Each day at noon and at 6 pm, the chorale The Bells of Kallio Church (Kallion kirkon kellosävel, JS 102) by Jean Sibelius, composed for the church's 1912 consecration ceremony, is played on four of the bells. He also arranged this piece for piano, as well as for mixed choir a cappella (each Op. 65b). The three largest bells ring to announce church services.

== Pipe organs ==
Kallio Church has both a Neo-Baroque and a French-style Romantic revival organ. The French-Romantic organ was made by the Swedish organ maker Åkerman & Lund in 1995 and serves as the main organ of the church. The smaller Neo-Baroque organ was built by Kangasala Organ Factory, Finland in 1987.

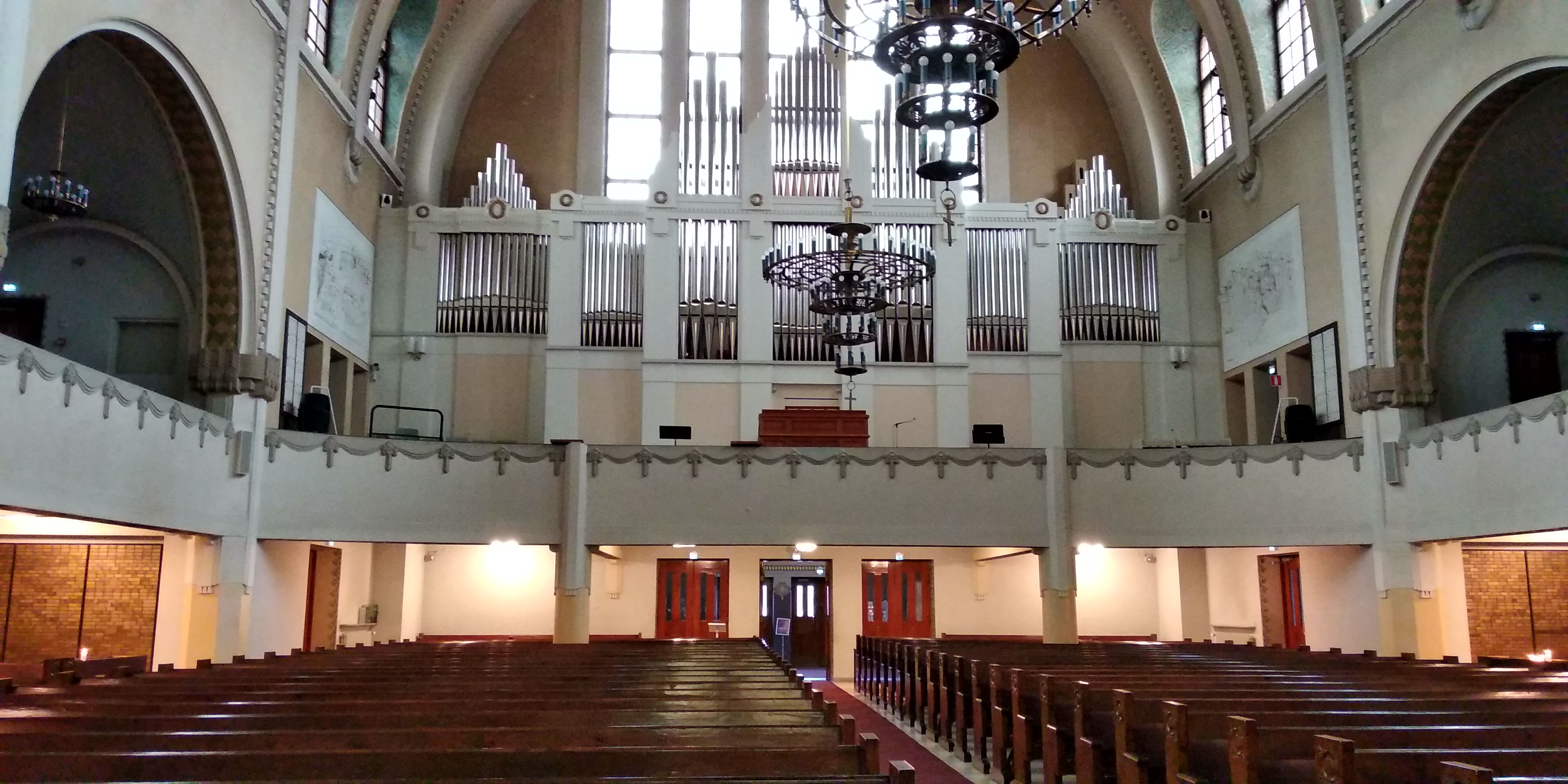

== Columbarium ==
A columbarium under the church was completed in 1991. There is room for around 2500 urns at a time, and the urns can be kept in the columbarium for a fixed period. After that, they can be concealed in a sepulchre, also situated under the church. The columbarium can only be visited when an urn is taken there.

Visitors can bring flowers or light candles by the memorial for the departed, which can be found on the back wall of the church, beside the main entrance.

== See also ==
- Kallion seurakunta (in Finnish)
- Emporis, Kallio Cathedral
- Finnish Architecture, Kallio Church
