= First Capital REIT =

Canadian real estate investment trust

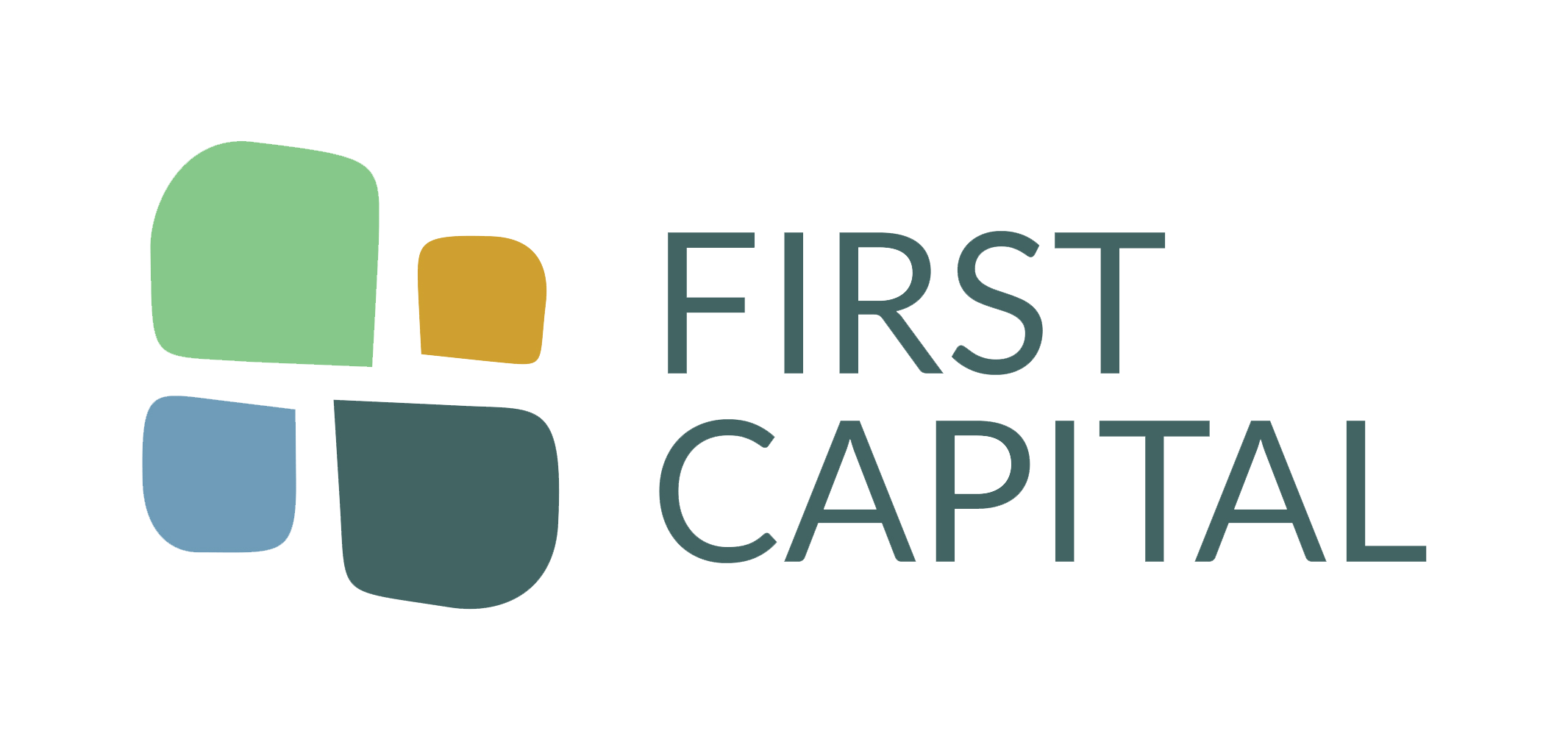
- Type: Public
- Traded as: TSX: FCR.UN; S&P/TSX Composite Component
- Industry: Commercial Real Estate
- Founded: 1994
- Founder: Dori Segal
- Headquarters: Toronto, Ontario, Canada
- Key people: Adam E. Paul (President and Chief executive officer)
- Revenue: $688 million CAD (2023)
- Total assets: $9.8 billion CAD (2023)
- Website: fcr.ca

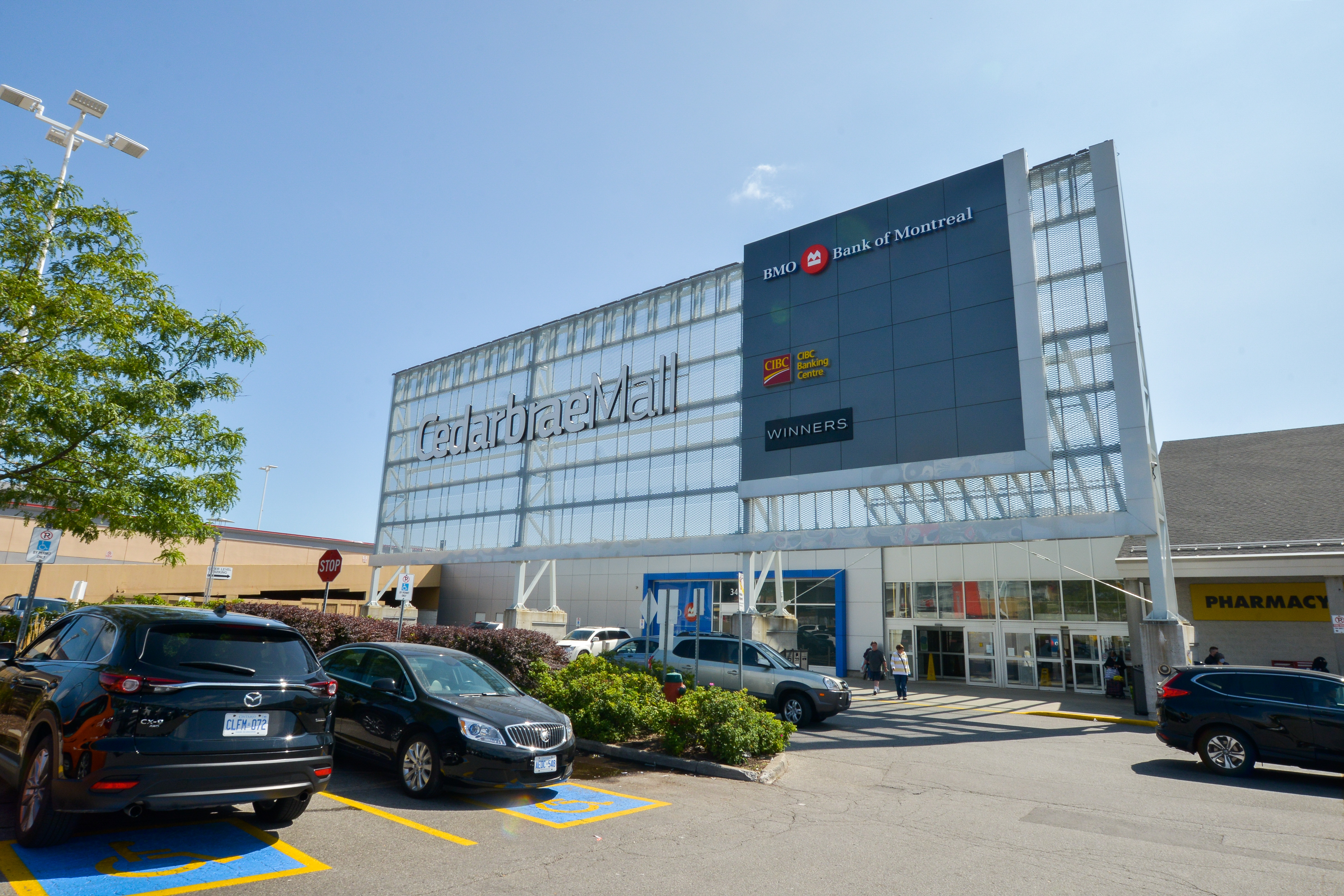
Cedarbrae Mall, a First Capital Property

First Capital REIT is a Canadian public real estate company, specializing in retail real estate, and based in Toronto, Ontario. It is one of the largest retail landlords in Canada.

== History ==
First Capital was founded in 1994 as Centrefund Realty through a 1994 IPO. It started with 5 properties, and grew to 70 properties by 2000. In May 2000, Riocan Real Estate Investment Trust briefly entered discussions into buying First Capital. Gazit Group ended up acquiring the company, which was restructured and renamed First Capital Realty in 2001.

Gazit Group (now Gazit-Globe) was a significant shareholder in First Capital up until March 2020.

As of 2003, First Capital had 81 properties, after spinning off its American properties and acquiring 18 properties during the year. In 2011, First Capital Realty bought Hazelton Lanes, a shopping centre in Yorkville, Toronto, for $110 million.

In December 2019, the company rebranded as First Capital REIT, and reorganized into a Real Estate Investment Trust

As of March 31, 2024, First Capital REIT owns interests in 139 neighbourhoods, totaling 22.2 million square feet of gross leasable area worth $9.2 billion in total assets.

== Business ==
As of March 31, 2024, First Capital owns interests in 139 neighbourhoods, totalling 22.2 million square feet of gross leasable area worth $9.2 billion in total assets. Major tenant groups include; grocery stores (17.1% of 2023 annual rent), medical & personal services (15.5%), restaurants (13.0%), pharmacies (9.2%), and banks (8.1%). The top ten tenants, as of December 31, 2023, were Loblaws, Sobeys, Metro, Canadian Tire, Walmart, TD Canada Trust, Dollarama, Goodlife Fitness, Save-On-Foods and RBC Royal Bank.

First Capital owns, operates, and develops grocery anchored open-air centres in neighbourhoods with the strongest demographics in Canada. As of December 31, 2023, the average population density within 5 kilometers of FCR properties is 295,000, up 44% since 2016

In September 2017, it was announced that First Capital was considering selling $500 million worth of properties in Ottawa and Toronto in which it has a partial interest. As December 31, 2023, 45% of the FCR portfolio is in the Greater Toronto and Greater Ottawa areas.

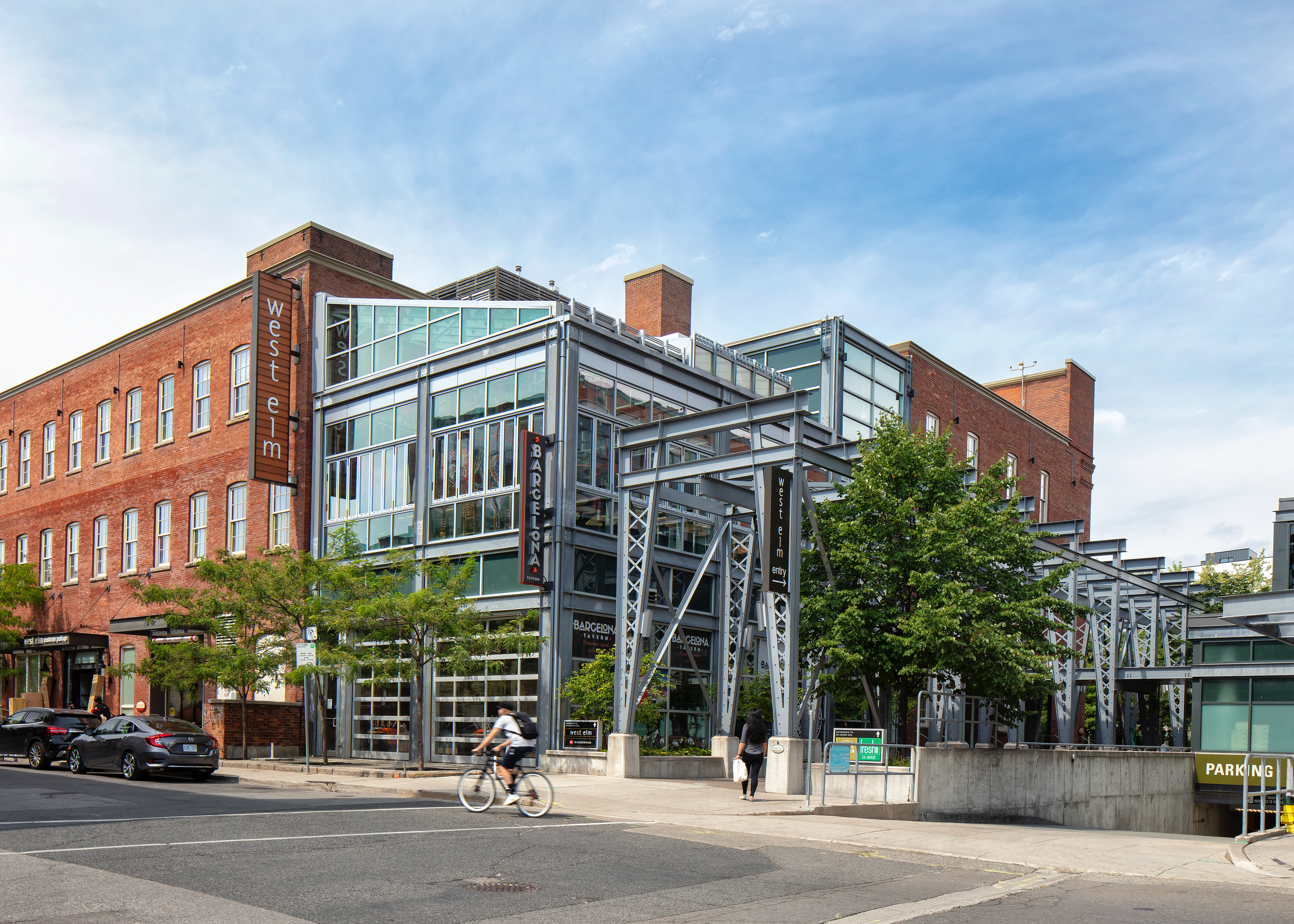
Shops at King Liberty, a First Capital Property in Liberty Village, Toronto

In December 2019, FCR converted from a corporation to a real estate investment trust, listing on December 30 on the TSX as FCR.UN.

== Sustainability and environmental responsibilities ==
Since 2006, First Capital has engaged in several sustainability initiatives, starting with its commitment to develop all properties using Leadership in Energy and Environmental Design (LEED) standards.

In 2020, First Capital released its 2020-2024 Environmental, Social, and Governance (ESG) Roadmap, and Sustainability Policy, outlining current and future sustainability plans.

In 2020, FCR received a 4-star ranking by the Global Real Estate Sustainability Benchmark (GRESB), was awarded Silver 2020 Green Lease Leader Recognition by the Institute for Market Transformation (IMT) and the U.S. Department of Energy's Better Building Alliance. First Capital also received Prime Status for Corporate ESG Performance by the Institutional Shareholder Services

In 2021, FCR has achieved a 'AAA' rating in the Morgan Stanley Capital International (MSCI) ESG Ratings assessment for the third year in a row, a 4-star ranking by the Global Real Estate Sustainability Benchmark (GRESB) in 2020, awarded Silver 2020 Green Lease Leader Recognition by the Institute for Market Transformation (IMT) and the U.S. Department of Energy's Better Building Alliance, and received Prime Status for Corporate ESG Performance by the Institutional Shareholder Services 2020.

In 2022, First Capital was once again named one of Canada's Top Small and Medium Employers. FCR was the first Canadian retail REIT to be a signatory in support of the Task Force on Climate-Related Financial Disclosures and received validation from the Science Based Targets Initiative (SBTi) for their 2030 GHG reduction target of 46%.

In 2023, FCR implemented more than 300 electric vehicle charging stations and over 1,100 bike racks across their portfolio. First Capital was listed as a top 30 Canadian company in Sustainaltyics ‘Road to Net Zero’ Ranking. The FCR Thriving Neighbourhoods Foundation also raised over $925,000 in contributions for charities and non-profits across Canada since its launch in 2020.

== Properties ==
As of December 31, 2023 around 33.2% of First Capital REIT's annual rent came from its top 10 tenants - Loblaws (94 stores, 10.5% of rent), Sobeys (50 stores, 5.5% of rent), Metro (35 stores, 3.2% of rent), Canadian Tire (19 stores, 2.9% of rent), Walmart (10 stores, 2.1% of rent), TD Canada Trust (43 stores, 2.0% of rent), Dollarama (51 stores, 1.9% of rent), GoodLife Fitness (26 stores, 1.8% of rent), Save-On-Foods (8 stores, 1.7% of rent), and Royal Bank of Canada (35 stores, 1.6% of rent). Around 54.9% of First Capital REIT's annual rent came from its top 40 tenants.

Notable properties owned by First Capital include:

=== Ontario ===
- 102-108 Yorkville Avenue in Toronto
- Appleby Village in Toronto
- 101 Yorkville Avenue in Toronto
- Shops at King Liberty in Toronto
- Cedarbrae Mall in Scarborough
- Yorkville Village (formerly known as Hazelton Lanes) in Toronto

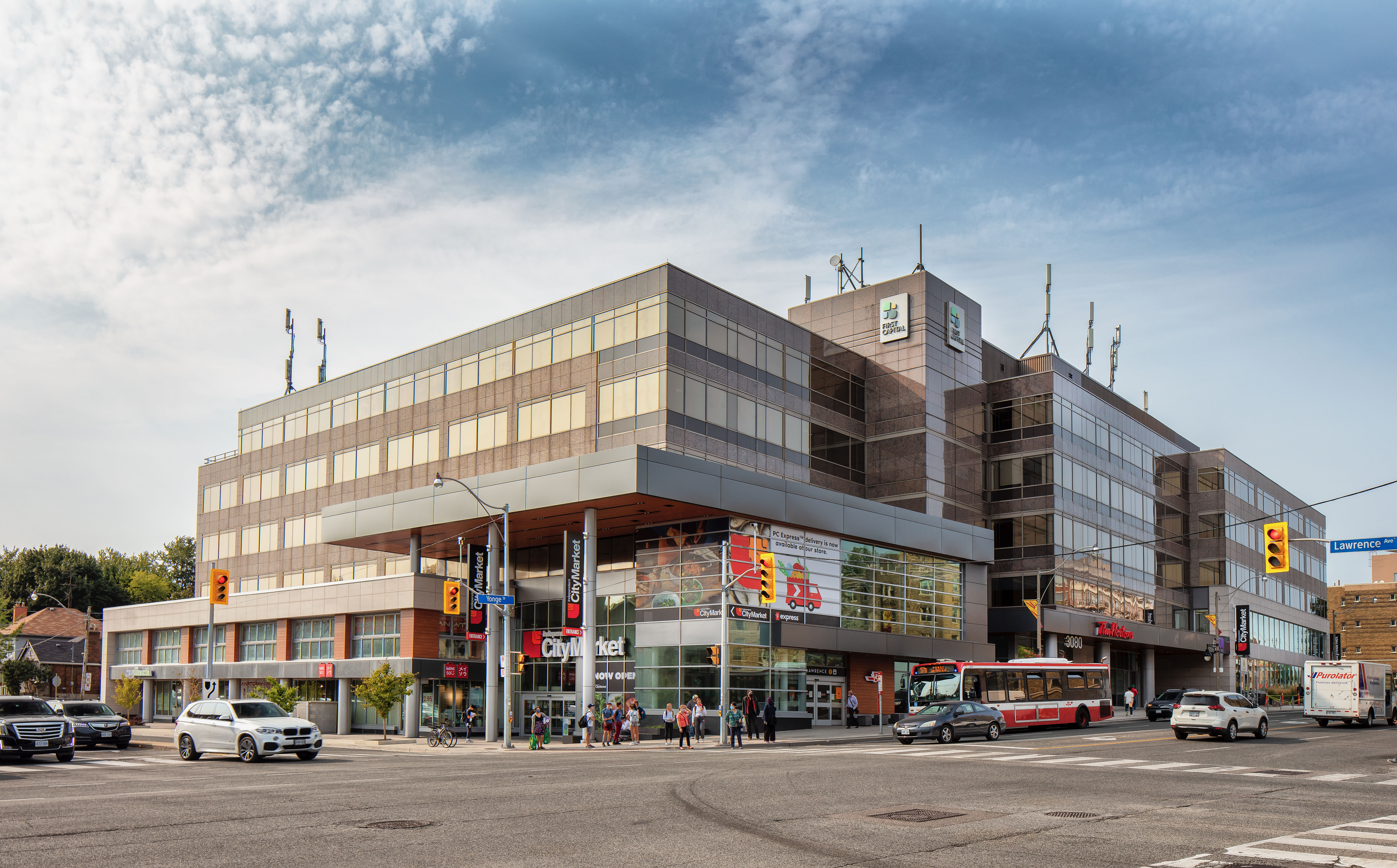
3080 Yonge Street, a First Capital property in midtown Toronto.

- One Bloor in Toronto
- Meadowvale Town Centre in Mississauga
- Parkway Mall in Scarborough
- College Square in Ottawa
- Merivale Mall in Ottawa
- Strandherd Crossing in Ottawa
- Leaside Village in Toronto
- York Mills Gardens in Toronto
- 3080 Yonge Street in Toronto
- King High Line in Toronto
- 1 Bloor East in Toronto
- Yonge & Roselawn in Toronto
- 2150 Lakeshore Boulevard West (formerly known as the Christie Cookie Site) in Toronto
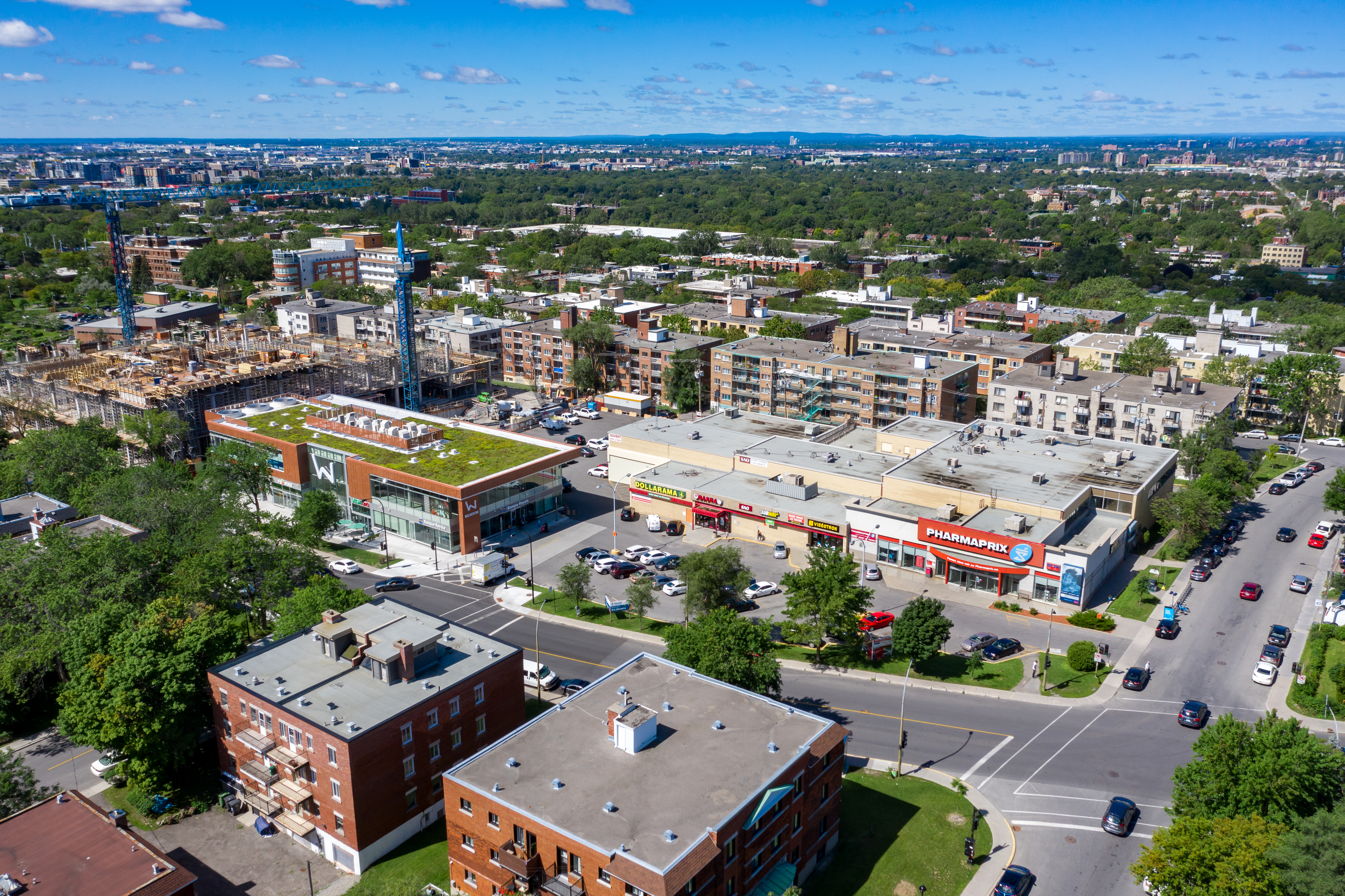
  Centre Wilderton, a First Capital Property & Development in Montreal, Quebec

=== Quebec ===
- Place Portobello in Brossard
- Place Panama in Brossard

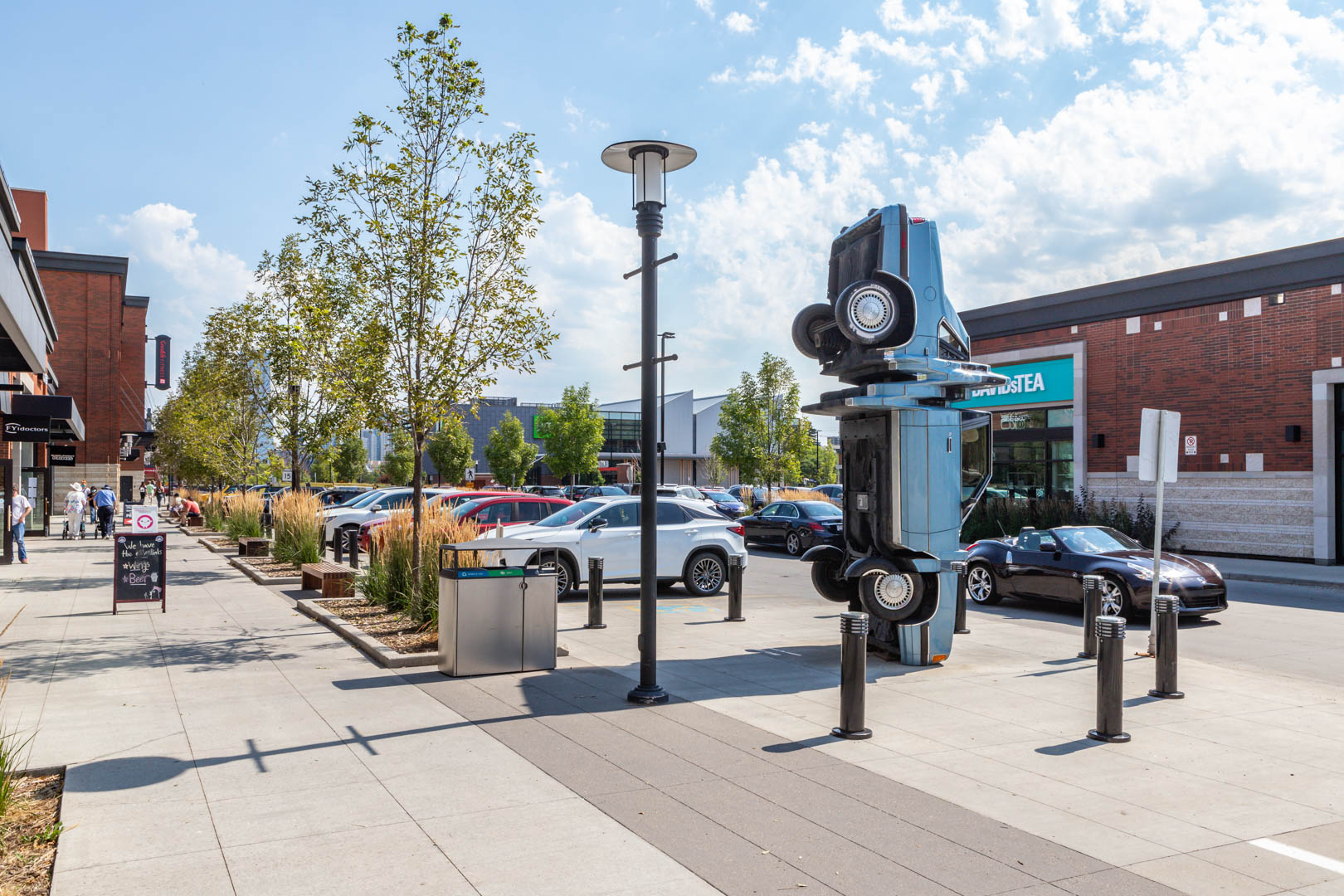
Edmonton Brewery District, a First Capital property in Edmonton, Alberta.

- Centre Domaine in Montreal
- Galeries Normandie in Montreal.
- Carre Lucerne in Montreal
- Place Michelete in Montreal
- Place Viau in Montreal
- Wilderton Centre in Montreal
- Griffintown 225 Peel in Montreal
- Griffintown 100 Peel in Montreal

=== Alberta ===
- Mount Royal Village in Calgary
- Edmonton Brewery District in Edmonton
- Meadowlark Health & Shopping Centre in Edmonton
- Northgate Centre in Edmonton
- Seton Village in Calgary
- Cranston Market in Calgary
- Old Strathcona in Edmonton

=== British Columbia ===
- Semiahmoo Shopping Centre in Surrey
- Shops at New West in New Westminster
- False Creek Village in Vancouver
- Terra Nova Village in Richmond
- Pemberton Plaza in North Vancouver
