= Cedarbrae =

Cedarbrae can refer to:

- Cedarbrae, Calgary, a neighbourhood in Calgary, Alberta, Canada
- Cedarbrae, alternative name of Woburn, Toronto, a neighborhood in the Scarborough district of Toronto

Cedarbrae, alternative name of Bendale, a neighbourhood in Toronto, Ontario, Canada

- Cedarbrae Collegiate Institute, a public high school in Toronto, Ontario, Canada
- Cedarbrae Public School, a public elementary school in Waterloo, Ontario, Canada
- Cedarbrae Mall, a shopping center in Toronto
