= Maryvale, Toronto =

Maryvale
- Neighbourhood
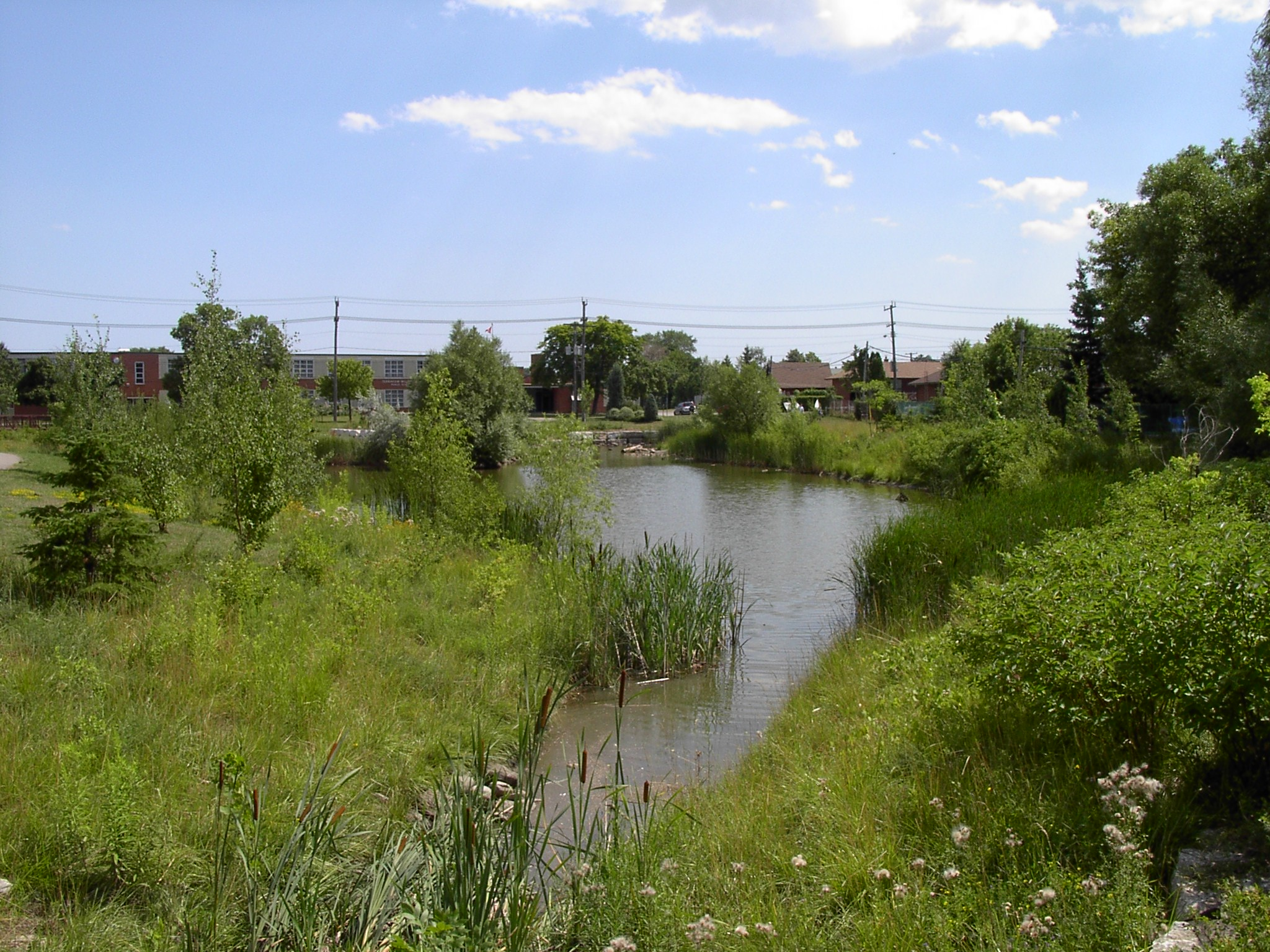
- View of Taylor-Massey Creek from Terraview Willowfield Park

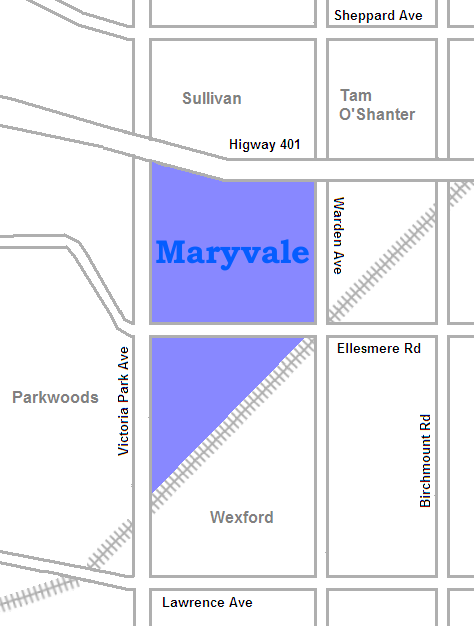
- Coordinates: 43°44′35″N 79°18′16″W
- Country: Canada
- Province: Ontario
- City: Toronto
- Established: 1850 Scarborough Township
- Changed municipality: 1998 Toronto from City of Scarborough

Maryvale is a neighbourhood in Toronto, Ontario, Canada. It is located on the western edge of the Scarborough district, with its western border being Victoria Park Avenue. To the north it is bordered by Highway 401, to the east by Warden and to the south by railroad tracks.

== History ==
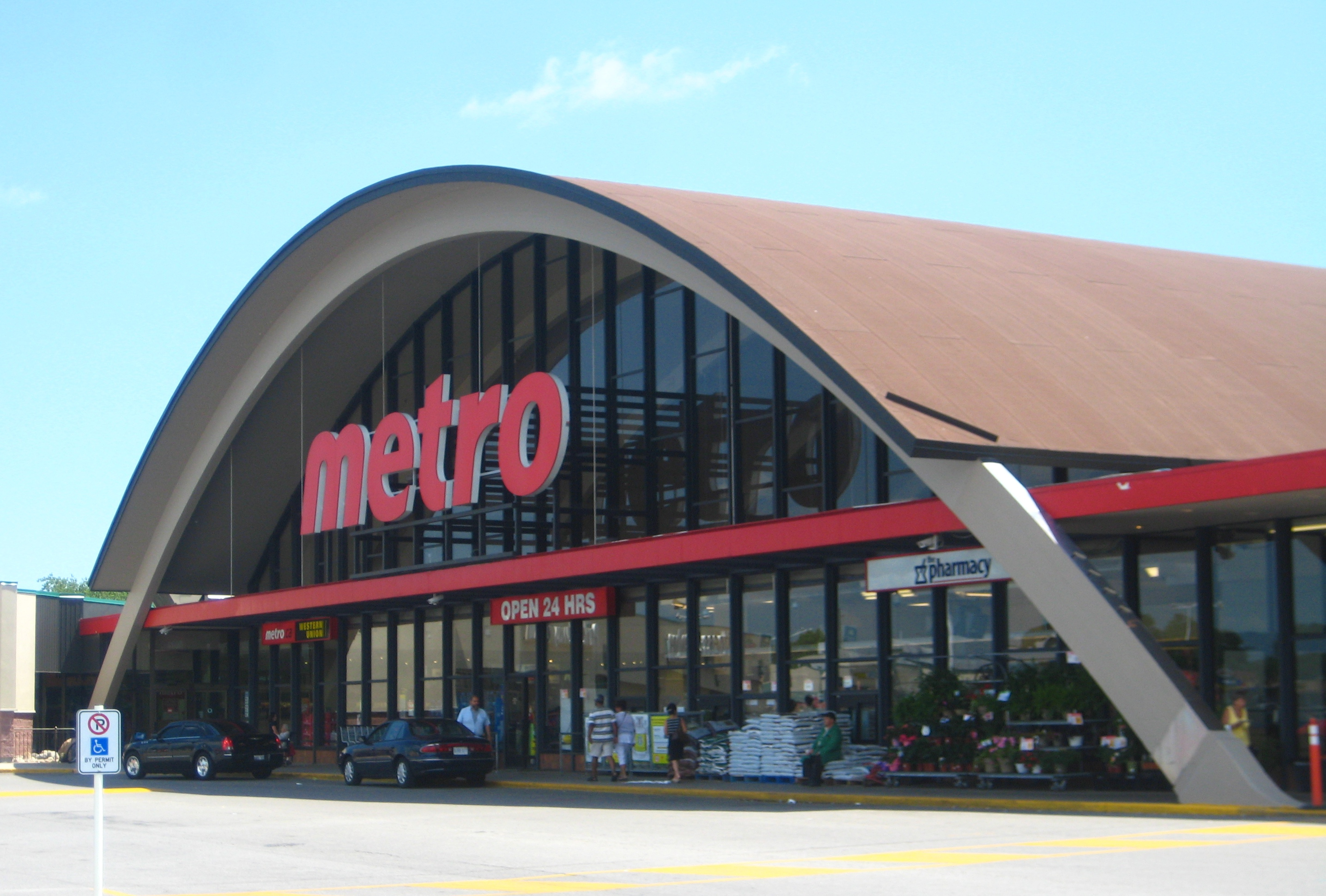
The Parkway Mall is a local landmark and registered heritage building.

The area was first settled as farmland and the neighbourhood is named after the Maryvale farm that once covered part of the area. It was an early part of Scarborough to be developed, being turned into a new suburb in the early 1950s.

The most prominent landmark in the community is the Metro store at Parkway Mall which has a distinctively curved roof, that was the largest wooden arch in Canada at the time of its construction. Originally built as a Grand Union store in 1958 and later converted to a Miracle Food Mart, the Parkway Mall Metro location was declared a heritage building in 2009.

== Education ==
Two public school boards operate elementary schools in Maryvale, the separate Toronto Catholic District School Board (TCDSB), and the secular Toronto District School Board (TDSB).

- Maryvale Public School is a Kindergaten to Grade 8 school that opened in 1955 and was built close to the original farm of the William Sylvester family, who had emigrated from Wexford, Ireland. At a later date, the William Gooderham family purchased the land, and subsequently "Maryvale Farms" was acquired by Frank Patrick O'Connor.
- Our Lady of Wisdom Separate School
- Terraview-Willowfield Public School was built in 1958 as Willowfield Gardens Public School and merged with nearby Terraview Heights Public School in 1984. It has a pond nearby for outdoor education. The former Terraview school building is used by the board as Parkview Alternative School', a grade 9-12 secondary school originally affiliated with Scarborough Centre for Alternative Studies originally named Overflow and the boards “Caring and Safe School” fresh start program for the Learning Centre Region 2 area.

Neither school board operates a secondary school in the neighbourhood, with TCDSB/TDSB secondary school students residing in Maryvale attending institutions in adjacent neighbourhoods although an alternative school exists nearby (see above). The French first language public secular school board, Conseil scolaire Viamonde, and it separate counterpart, Conseil scolaire catholique MonAvenir also offer schooling to applicable residents of Maryvale, although they do not operate a school in the neighbourhood, with CSCM/CSV students attending schools situated in other neighbourhoods in Toronto.
