= Citycon =

Finnish real estate investment company

Citycon Corporation
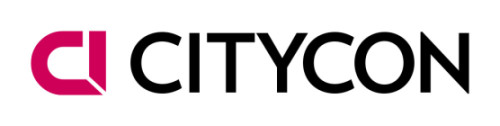

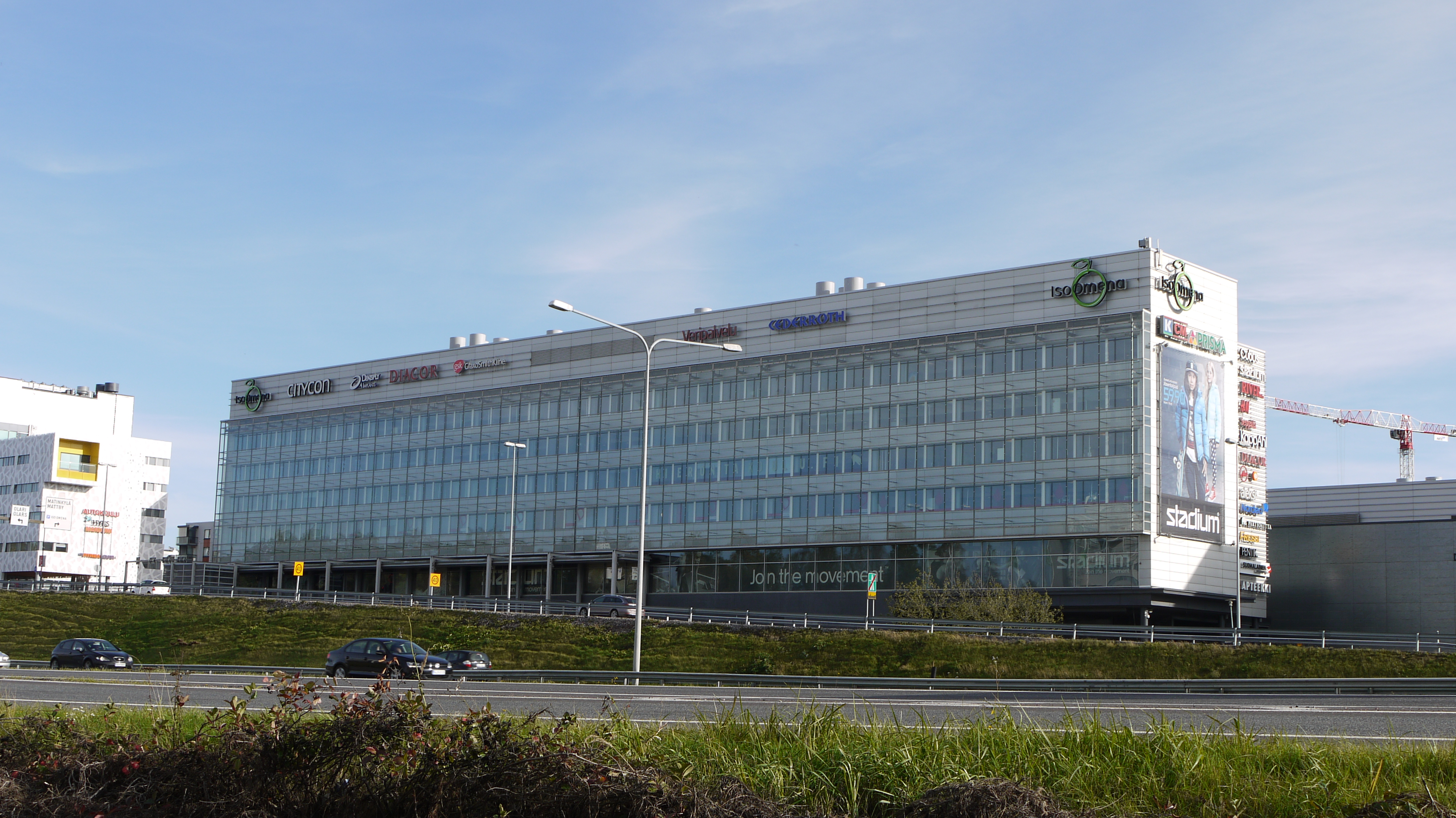
- Citycon headquarters are located in Iso Omena shopping centre, Espoo
- Type: Julkinen osakeyhtiö; (Public company)
- Traded as: Nasdaq Helsinki: CTY1S
- Industry: Real estate
- Founded: 1988; 38 years ago
- Headquarters: Espoo, Uusimaa, Finland
- Key people: Chaim Katzman (Chairman); F. Scott Ball (President and CEO); Sakari Järvelä (CFO)
- Revenue: ▲€321 million (2024); €290 million (2023)
- Operating income: ▲€30 million (2024); €−38 million (2023)
- Net income: ▲€−38 million (2024); €−115 million (2023)
- Total assets: ▲€4.303 billion (2024); €4.208 billion (2023)
- Total equity: ▼€1.858 billion (2024); €1.987 billion (2023)
- Owner: Gazit-Globe (49%)
- Number of employees: 237 (July 2023)
- Website: www.citycon.com

Citycon Oyj is a Finnish real estate investment company that owns, develops, and manages urban centers and other commercial properties in Finland, Norway, Sweden, Estonia and Denmark (formerly also in Latvia & Lithuania). The company primarily rents its premises to retail, service and office tenants and has also rental apartments. As of December 2025, Citycon owns 28 urban centres. Of the urban centres 9 are located in Finland, including Iso Omena, 10 in Norway, 6 in Sweden, including Kista Galleria, 1 in Estonia (Rocca al Mare Shopping Centre) and 2 in Denmark. Citycon’s centres attract approximately 125 million visitors annually.

The company is listed on the Main List of the Helsinki Stock Exchange.

== History ==
Citycon was founded in 1988 by the Insurance Company Sampo Pension Ltd, Imatran Voima Oy, Rakennustoimisto A. Puolimatka Oy and Postipankki.

Beginning in 2005, Citycon initiated its international expansion by acquiring properties in Sweden and Estonia(Rocca al Mare Shopping Centre), followed by further growth into Lithuania, Norway, and Denmark over the next decade. Notably, in 2015, Citycon acquired Norwegian shopping centre operator Sektor Gruppen, making it the largest listed shopping centre company in the Nordics.

In November 2025 the principal owner, G City, made an offer to take the company private at €4.00 per share. In September 2026 G City announced that it had reached 90% ownership in Citycon, and that subsequently the company will be de-listed from the Nasdaq Helsinki Exchange.
