= Yorkville Village =

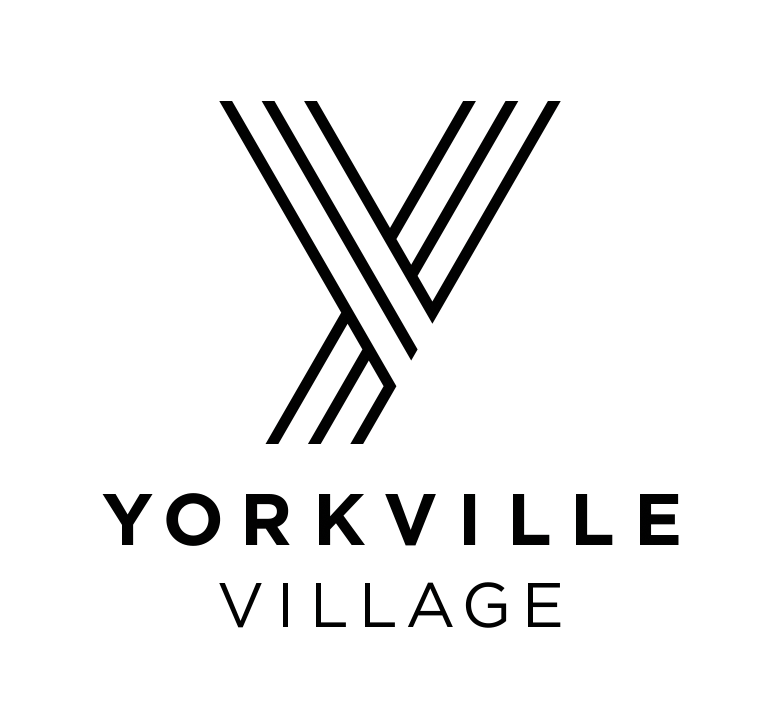

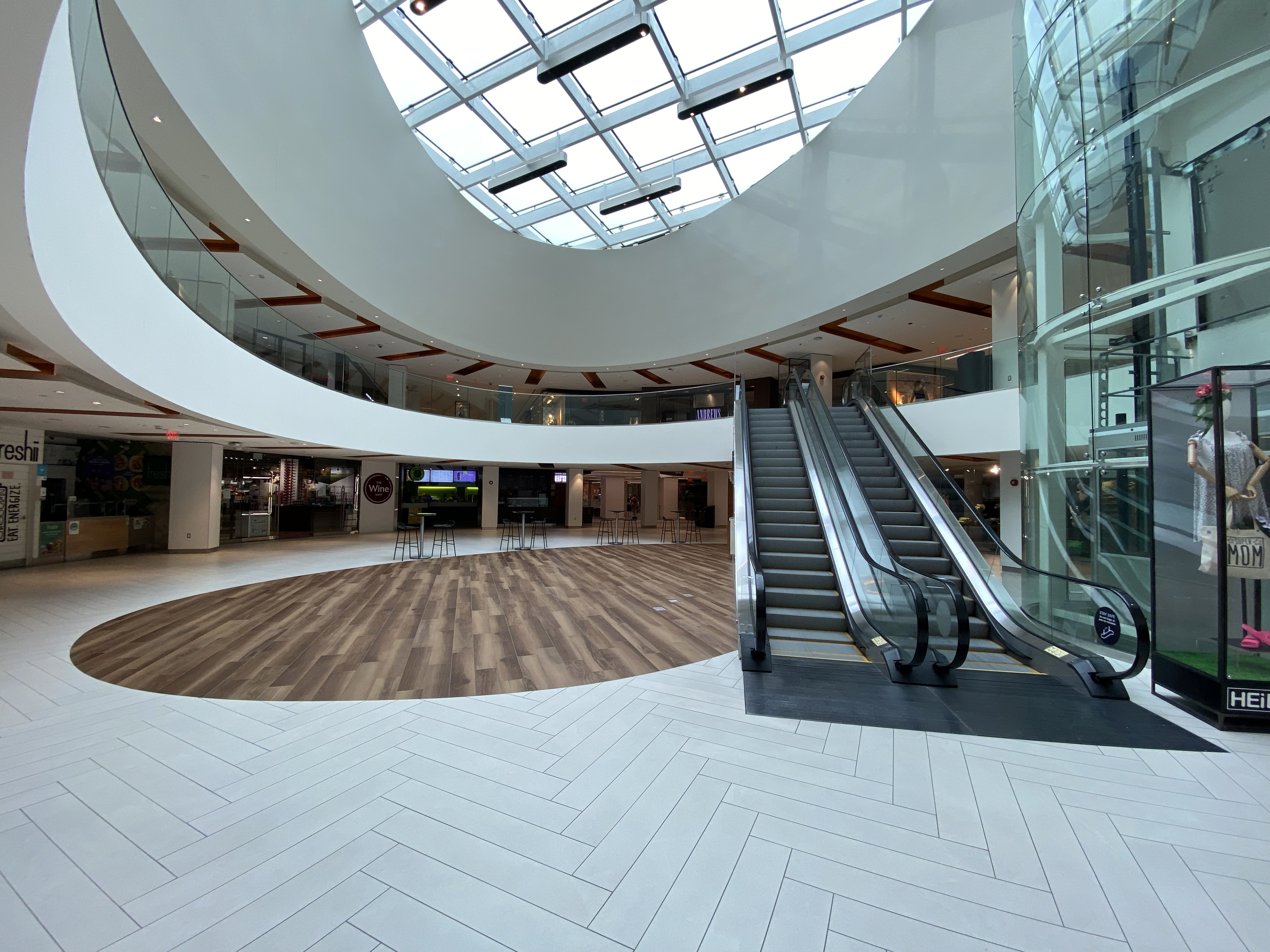
- Coordinates: 43.670976°N 79.394583°W
- Address: 55 Avenue Road; Toronto, Ontario; M5R 3L2
- Opened: October 1976
- Owner: First Capital Realty
- Num. of stores: 23
- Num. of anchor tenants: 2
- Floor area: 210,000 square feet (20,000 m^{2})
- Floors: 2
- Website: yorkvillevillage.com

Yorkville Village is a shopping mall in Toronto, Ontario, Canada. It is located in the Yorkville neighbourhood, along Avenue Road, north of Bloor Street. Prior to its redevelopment which concluded on January 25, 2016, it was known as Hazelton Lanes.

== History ==
=== Background ===
The early 1970s construction of the shopping centre and residential complex (that would be named Hazelton Lanes) was initiated and partly financed by the Toronto-based stockbroker-turned-real-estate-developer Ian Richard Wookey (1928–2014) who had been purchasing Yorkville properties (mostly empty lots and single family homes) since the mid-1960s. Born in İzmir to English immigrants in Turkey, Wookey attended a Jesuit school in the city of his birth followed by a boarding school in England before, at the age of 17, joining the Royal Navy that stationed him in post-World War II Athens, Greece. By 1951, he immigrated to Canada: settling in Toronto and pursuing a career in finance. Having made a sizeable fortune in 1962 by acquiring a large block of shares of Canadian Oil Companies before its takeover by Shell Canada, Wookey decided to enter real estate—purchasing, in 1966, the lot on the north side of the Avenue Rd. and Cumberland St. intersection, followed by acquiring the cluster of houses just north of there at the north side of the Avenue Rd. intersection with Yorkville Ave, and then going on to buy as many Yorkville properties as he could.

At the time of Wookey's real estate purchases, Yorkville was the centre of the youth-oriented 1960s counterculture in Toronto, with hippies, biker gangs, and rooming houses the norm in the neighbourhood that nevertheless fostered an exciting cultural scene with young local artists such as Neil Young, Joni Mitchell, Gordon Lightfoot, Bruce Cockburn, Ian & Sylvia, Lenny Breau, Margaret Atwood, Gwendolyn MacEwen, etc. performing and socializing in its coffeehouses like the Riverboat, the Purple Onion, and the Penny Farthing. On the other hand, Toronto inhabitants outside of the youth demographic often referred to the neighbourhood in condemnatory terms such as a "slum" and a "festering sore in the middle of the city".

The first property Wookey re-developed in Yorkville was the cluster of Victorian homes he had purchased in 1966 on the Avenue-Yorkville north side, one of which had housed the Purple Onion until its 1965 closure. A proponent of adaptive reuse, Wookey hired architects Jack Diamond and Barton Myers for a project that saw the houses' interiors gutted while new Victorian-style archways and windows were added to the exterior, thus transforming the space into a new retail complex named York Square that opened in mid-1968.

=== Hazelton Lanes ===
In 1973, having already purchased a row of houses along Avenue Rd. north of York Square, Wookey began work on a new retail and residential complex that would partly be financed by French-American businessman Gérard Louis-Dreyfus whom Wookey brought in as a partner.

Designed by architect Boris Zerafa (1933–2002) of the Webb Zerafa Menkès Housden Partnership architectural firm, Hazelton Lanes opened in October 1976 with 60,000 square feet (5,600 m^{2}) of retail space. In addition to retail, the structure—built in place of eight former homes—featured a series of terraced condos on top of it, along with a courtyard in the middle that would be used as an ice-skating rink in the winter. Positioned as a luxury shopping centre, it attracted some prestigious retailers such as Hermès, Les Must de Cartier, Donald Davies Fashions, Guy Laroche, Bart Leather, Teuscher, and Vuokko. Emphasizing the complex's posh reputation, in a write-up about the opening of the retail part of Hazelton Lanes, the Globe and Mail's reporter observed that most of the shoppers "dressed up to walk the stores" before stating that some of the shop owners clad in "cashmere and costly boots, look like they would eat you alive if you wandered in wearing old trousers". In retrospect, some retail business analysts saw the ability of Hazelton Lanes to attract the upscale retailers that it had in direct correlation to opening one year before the first phase of Cadillac Fairview's marquee Toronto Eaton Centre urban mall, reasoning that had it opened after the more centrally located Eaton Centre, it likely wouldn't have been able to secure as many of them.

==== 1989 expansion ====
As a result of an expansion that took place during 1988 and 1989, Hazelton Lanes shopping complex tripled in size by adding address 87 Avenue Road to its north portion. It thus began hosting even more luxury retailers such as Versace, Valentino, Fogal of Switzerland, Emanuel Ungaro, Givenchy, Yves Saint Laurent Rive Gauche, and others. In 1991, a six-storey condominium building containing 71 units with the address 77 Avenue Road was built by the same developer, situated on top of the shopping centre's recently expanded portion. The original 55A Avenue Rd. terraced condo built in 1976 together with the shopping centre below it thus got a new counterpart condo on top of the shopping centre's expanded part. Despite different entrances, the mall and the newly-built 77 Avenue Rd. condo shared utilities, the parking garage and some core services. The mall and condo were set up as separate legal corporations, with contracts governing how they interact.

Hazelton Lanes began to experience difficult times in the early 1990s with the recession that gripped Toronto and much of Canada. Many of the upscale stores in Hazelton Lanes closed their doors, with some moving to the nearby Mink Mile along Bloor Street. With brick-work on parts of the complex's exterior falling into disrepair, as well as continual complaints over the interior's unusual configuration by contemporary mall standards featuring low ceilings and inconveniently-located entrances, Hazelton Lanes—though still considered upscale—became more of a neighbourhood shopping centre.

=== First Capital ownership, $100-million redevelopment, and name change ===
The shopping complex was bought by First Capital Realty in September 2011 for CA$110 million, which was reportedly paid out as a combination of cash and the assumption of a CA$58-million debt. The corporation spent CA$100 million to redevelop Yorkville Village. The redevelopment added 5,000 square feet (460 m^{2}) to the existing 210,000 square feet (20,000 m^{2}) of space and replaced all mechanical systems. The rebuild has added an Equinox Fitness as its second anchor, which opened its doors on February 3, 2016. The mall continues to be anchored by Whole Foods Market, which has remained throughout the renovation project. Along the Avenue Road frontage, a new double-height glass facade was added. The mall also added an entrance from Yorkville Avenue.

==== Controversy ====
First Capital's renovation of Hazelton Lanes led to conflict and lawsuits with the condominium corporation that runs the residential units. In one instance when First Capital needed to shut down electricity for renovations, several residents started a sit-in protest at the construction office which forced First Capital to back down, which was known in the community as the “Yom Kippur Rebellion”.
