= College Square (Ottawa) =

Shopping mall in Ottawa

Coordinates: 45.351°N 75.761°W

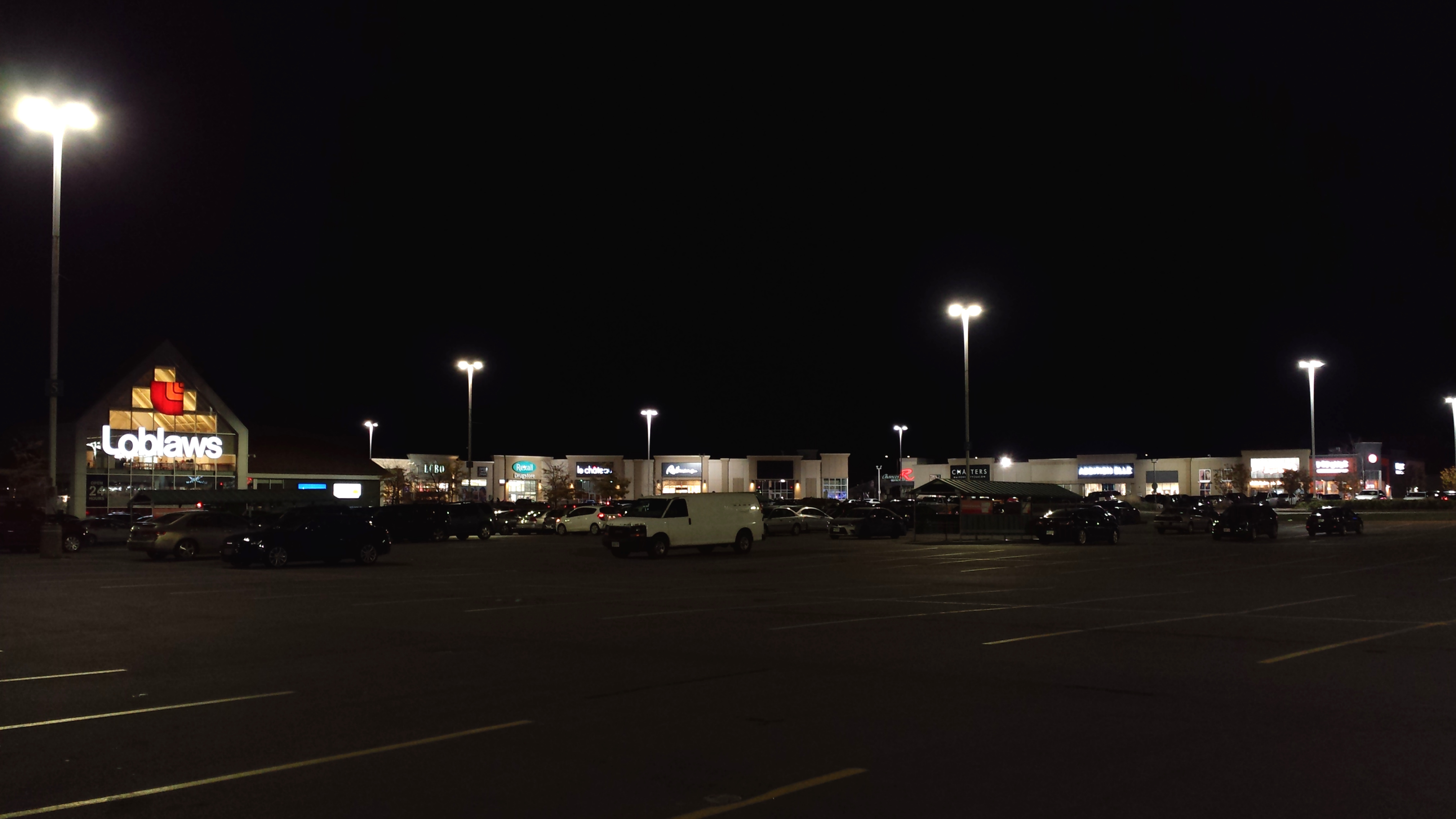
- College Square at night
- Address: 1900-1980 Baseline Road; Ottawa, Ontario; K2C 0C6
- Opened: 1961
- Previous names: Shoppers City West (1961—2001)
- Developer: First Capital Realty
- Num. of stores: 35
- Num. of anchor tenants: 2
- Floor area: 387,239 sqf
- Website: College Square

College Square is a shopping centre in Nepean, a suburb of Ottawa, Ontario, Canada, located at the intersection of Woodroffe Avenue and Baseline Road, and is north of Algonquin College. It has an area of 389,244 square feet (36,162.0 m^{2}) and houses 35 stores and services across 11 buildings.

Originally called Shoppers City West, the mall opened in November 1961. Over the years, the mall featured stores like Loblaws, Freimans, Towers (later Zellers), LCBO, BMO, Pet Valu as well as a miniature cinema featuring large TV's showing second-run movies and Chances R, a restaurant co-owned by former NHL player and Ottawa 67's coach Brian Kilrea. Other services detached from the main building included Top Valu gas station and car wash, Beer Store, McDonald's and a round-shaped building that had a convenience store, Pinto.

In July 2001, Shoppers City West was closed and redeveloped as College Square by First Capital Realty and the Leiken Group. The new stores opened 2002—2003. Current tenants include anchors Loblaws and Home Depot, Beer Store, Dollarama, Garage, LCBO, Kettleman's Bagel Co., McDonald's, Pizza Pizza, Popeyes, Rexall, Reitman's, Starbucks, Subway, Tim Hortons and Tommy Hilfiger. Chances R and BMO are the only remaining original tenants.
