= Parkway Mall =

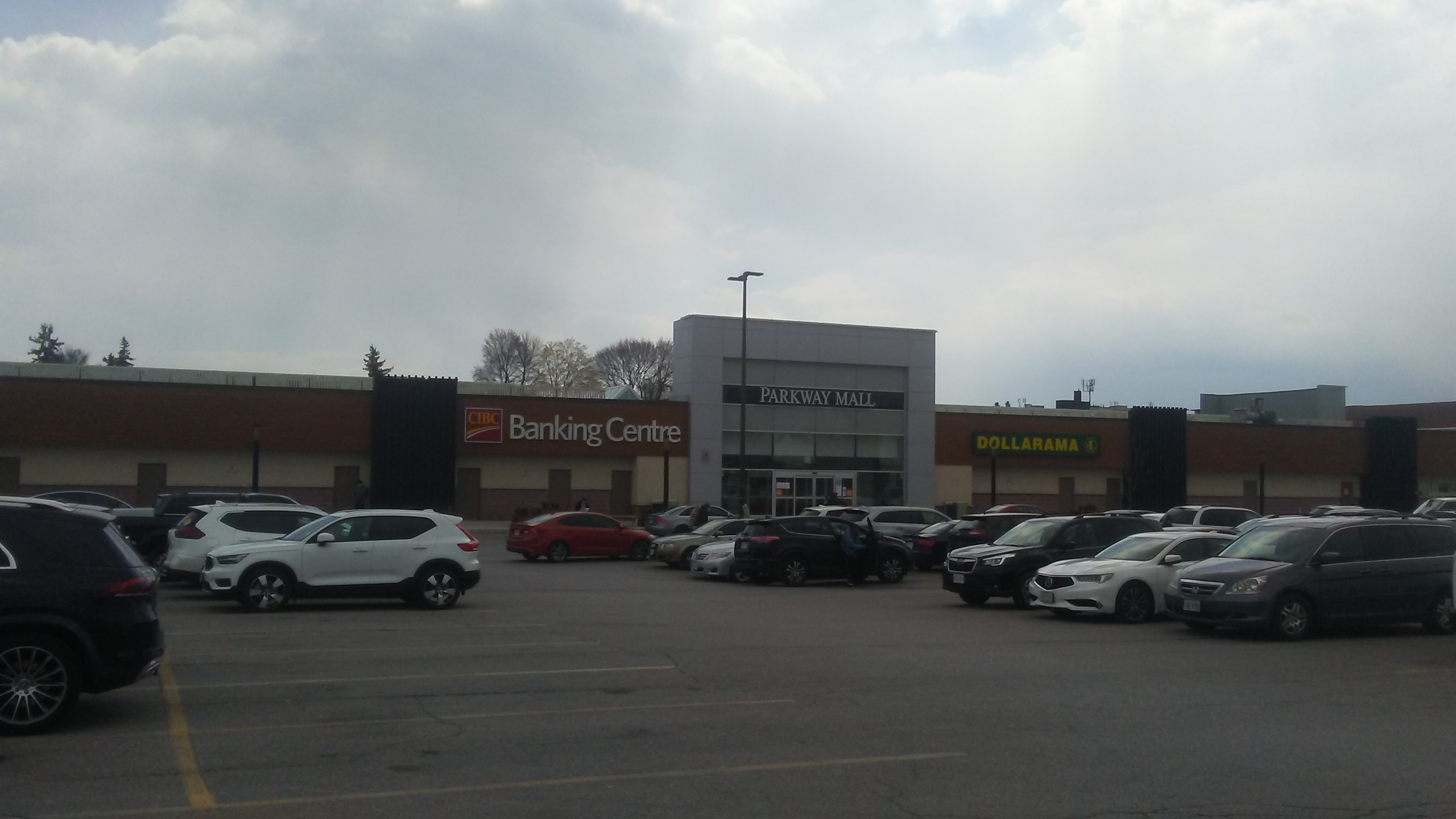
- Parkway Mall entrance and parking from Ellesmere Road
- Coordinates: 43.75724°N 79.31196°W
- Address: 85 Ellesmere Road; Toronto, Ontario; M1R 4B9
- Opened: 1958
- Developer: Bregman + Hamann Architects
- Manager: First Capital REIT
- Owner: First Capital REIT
- Num. of stores: Over 100
- Num. of anchor tenants: 4
- Floor area: 26,105 square metres (280,991.9 sq ft)
- Floors: 1 retail level, plus 1 basement and 1 office level
- Website: parkwaymall.ca

Parkway Mall (originally Parkway Plaza) is a community-scale shopping centre in Toronto, Ontario, Canada. It is located at the southeast corner of Victoria Park Avenue and Ellesmere Road in the Maryvale neighbourhood in the Scarborough district.

Parkway Mall is more geared toward providing essential community and neighbourhood-level retail stores and services, rather than being a large-scale regional shopping destination, such as the nearby Fairview or Scarborough Town Centre. The mall has always had a larger grocery store within it and for many years until the early 2000s also had a Zellers discount department store.

== Heritage status ==
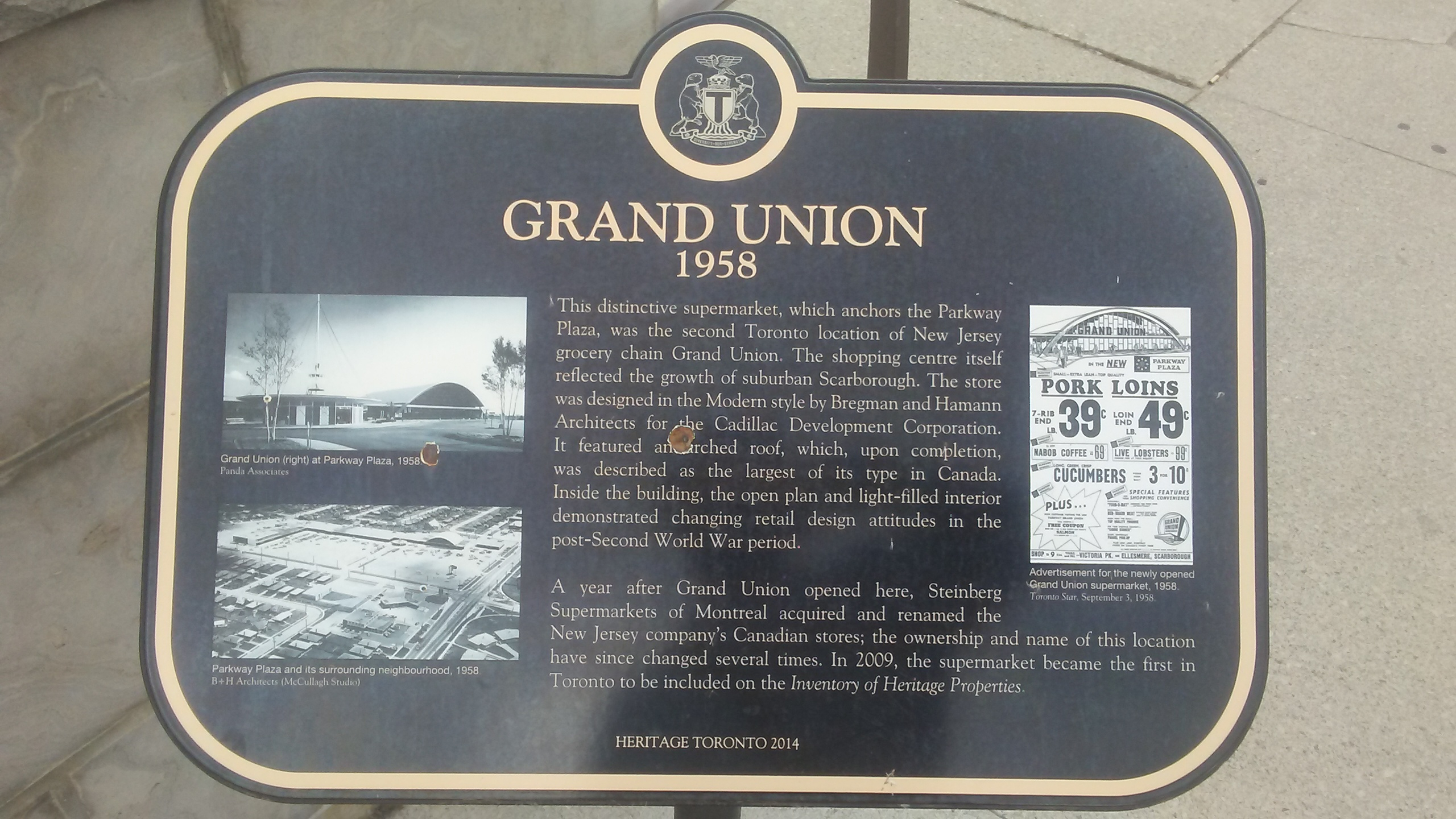
A commemorative plaque detailing the history of Grand Union.

In 2009, Parkway Plaza became the first post-war supermarket building to be added to the City of Toronto's Inventory of Heritage Properties, and it was designated under the Ontario Heritage Act in May 2015.

"In the late 1970s, Parkway Plaza underwent significant alterations. The circular record store building was demolished and the stores enlarged into space previously occupied by the parking lot. The revamp turned the shopping centre in on itself. Stores that used to face the outside world were reoriented to have their windows and entrances inside the mall, a move that left the complex with a forbidding facade of service doors and blank concrete walls." Built in 1958 and designed by Bregman & Hamann, it was originally used as the last new Canadian store for Grand Union, and briefly operated as such until it became a Steinberg's when Grand Union was bought out in 1959. It later became a Miracle Food Mart, and a Dominion up until 2008. It is currently a Metro store.

"What set the Parkway apart was the design of its anchor unit, leased to Grand Union supermarkets, that was essentially a gigantic parabolic arched roof with glass walls at either end. Supported by curved wooden beams, the structure was among largest of its kind built in Canada in 1958."

== Gallery ==
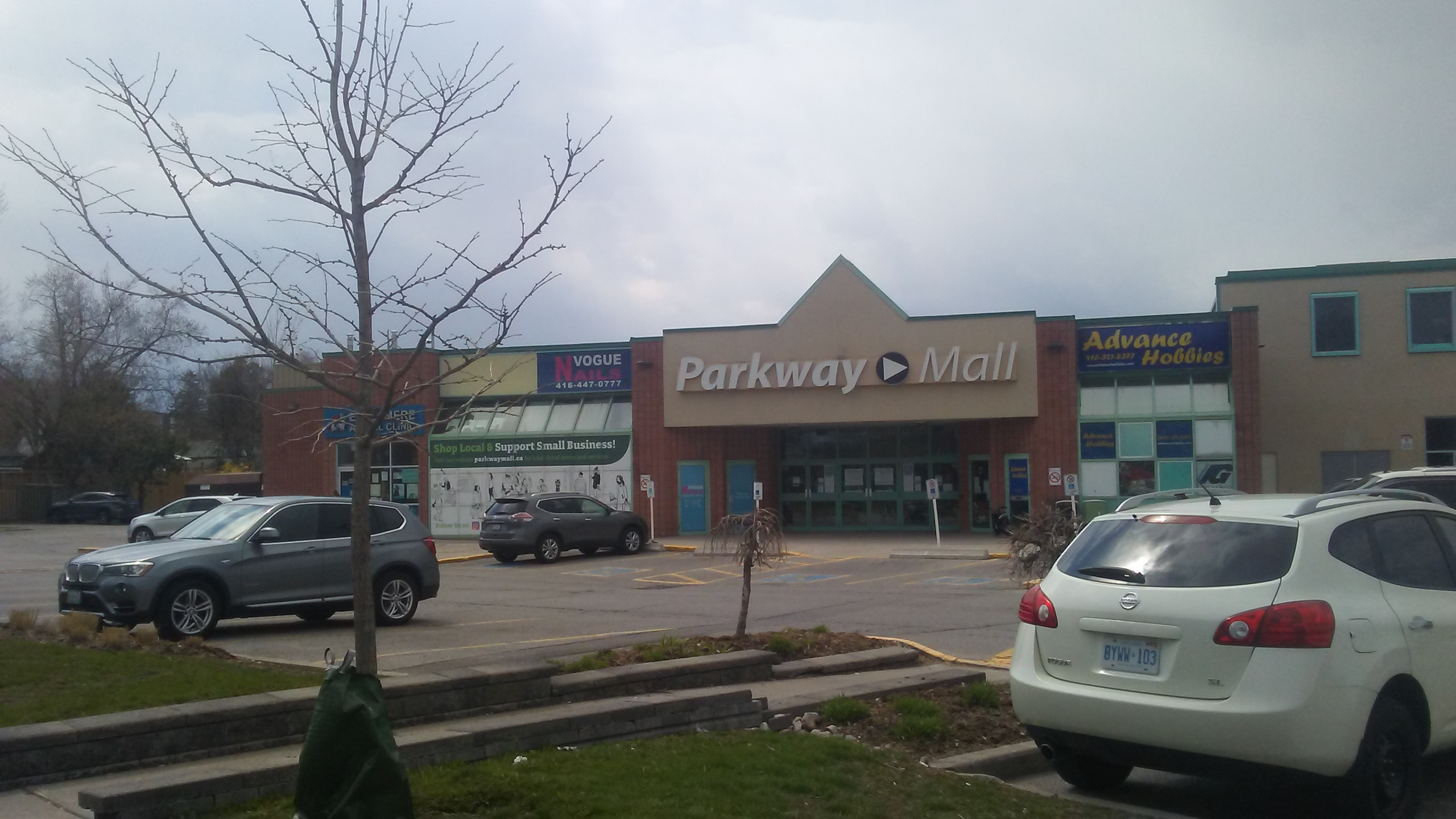
Parkway Mall entrance at Pharmacy Avenue

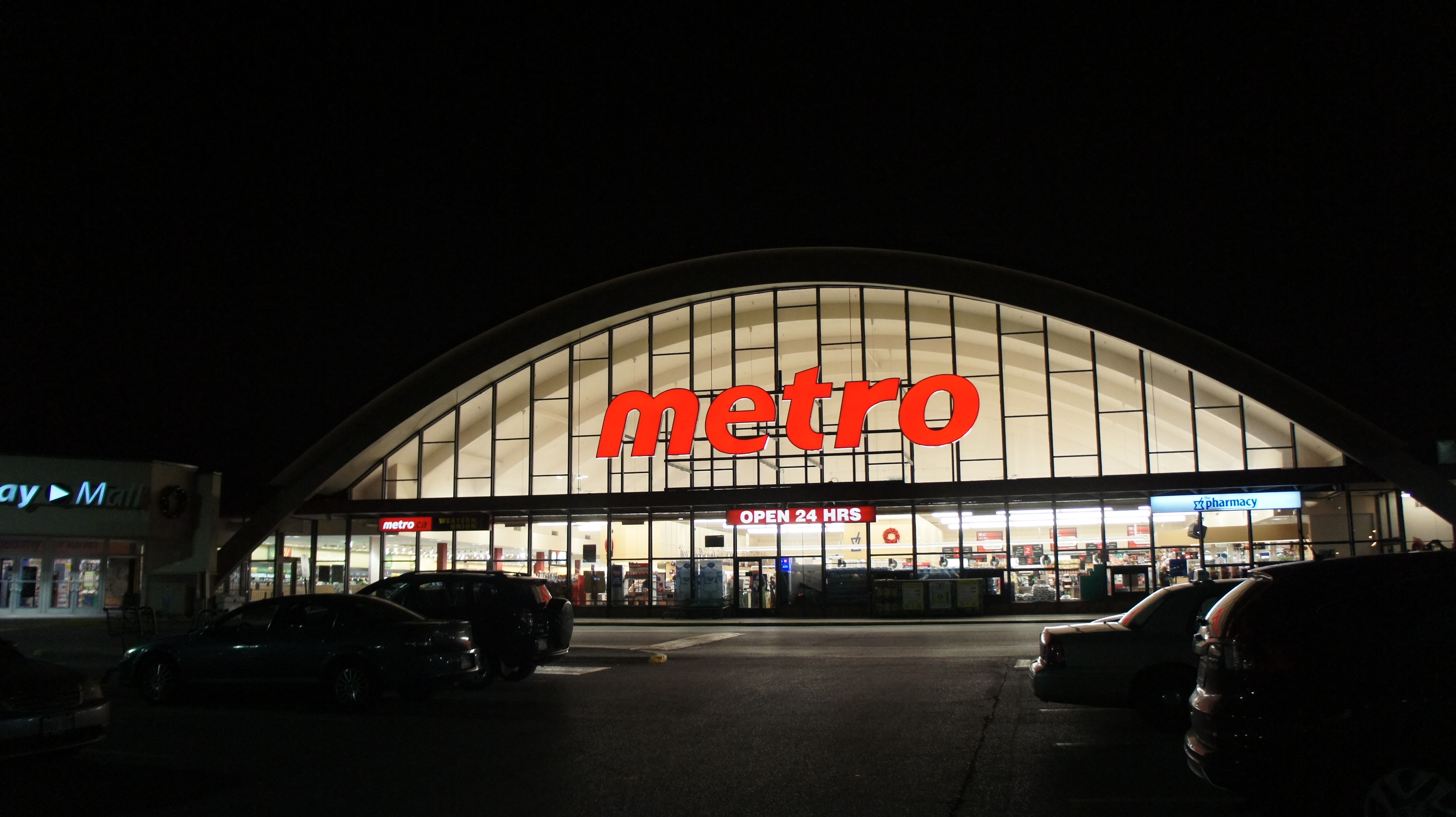
Metro supermarket in Parkway Plaza at night

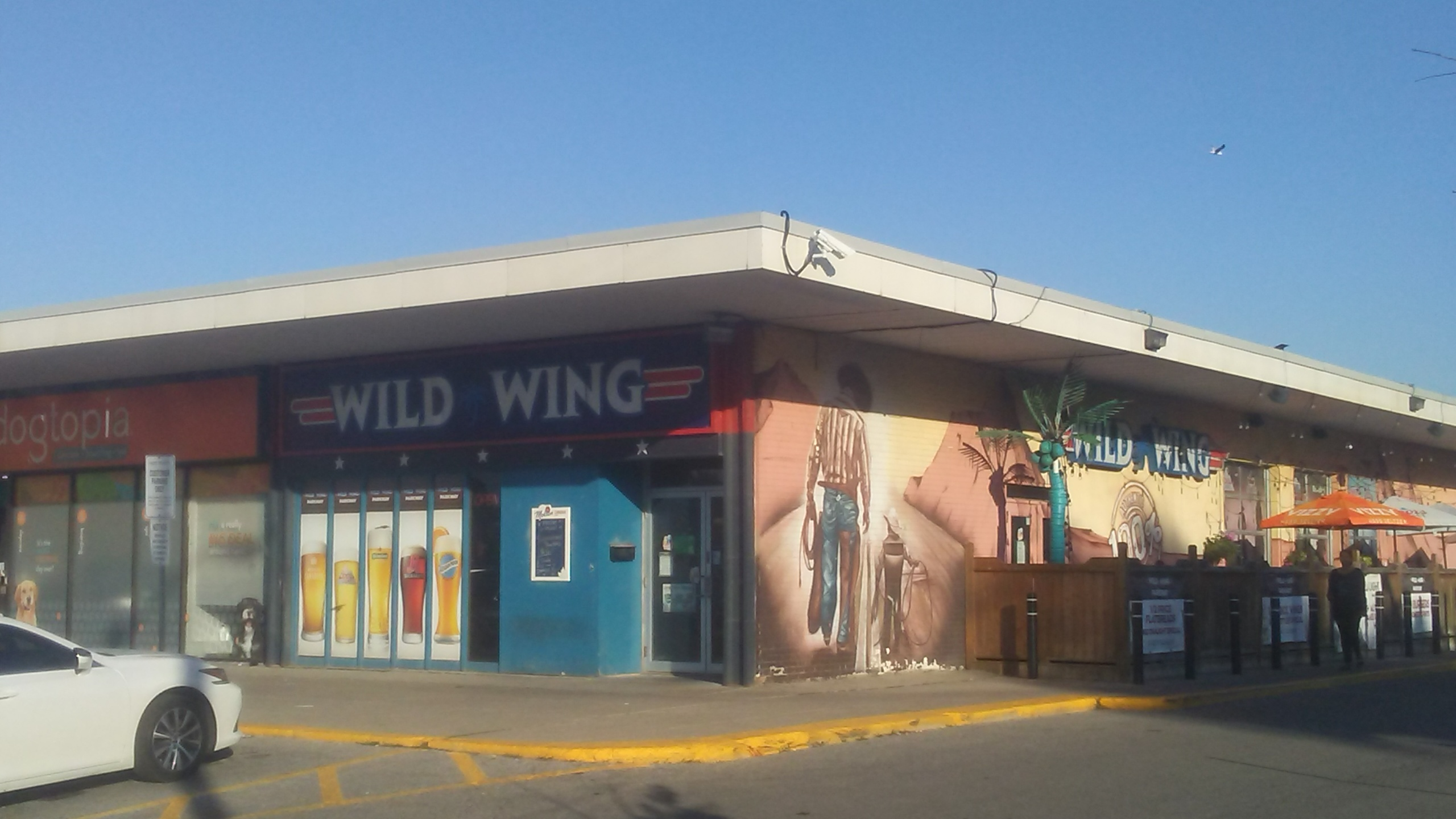
Wild Wing Parkway outlet

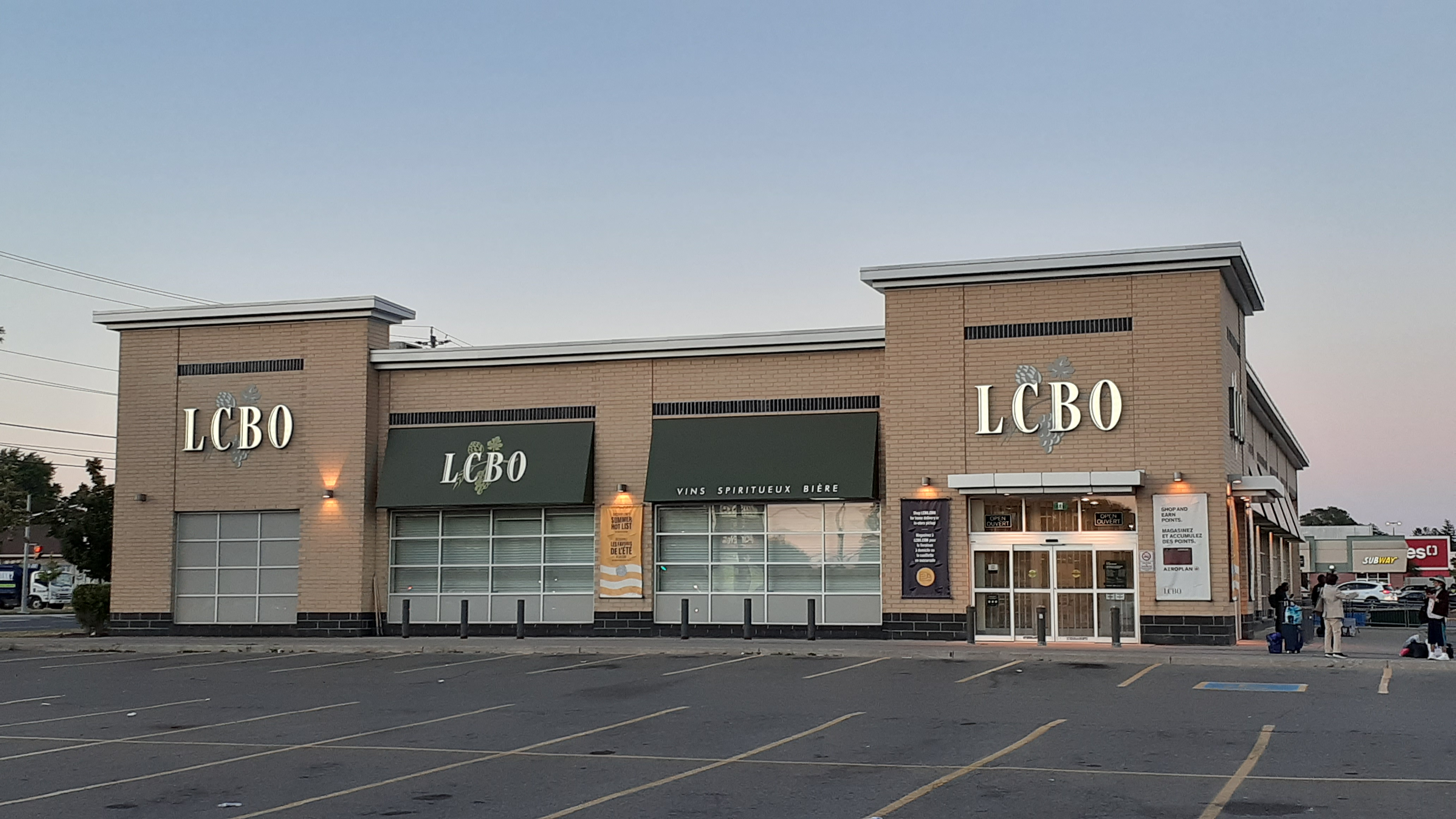
An LCBO outlet

== See also ==
- List of shopping malls in Toronto
