= Iso Omena =

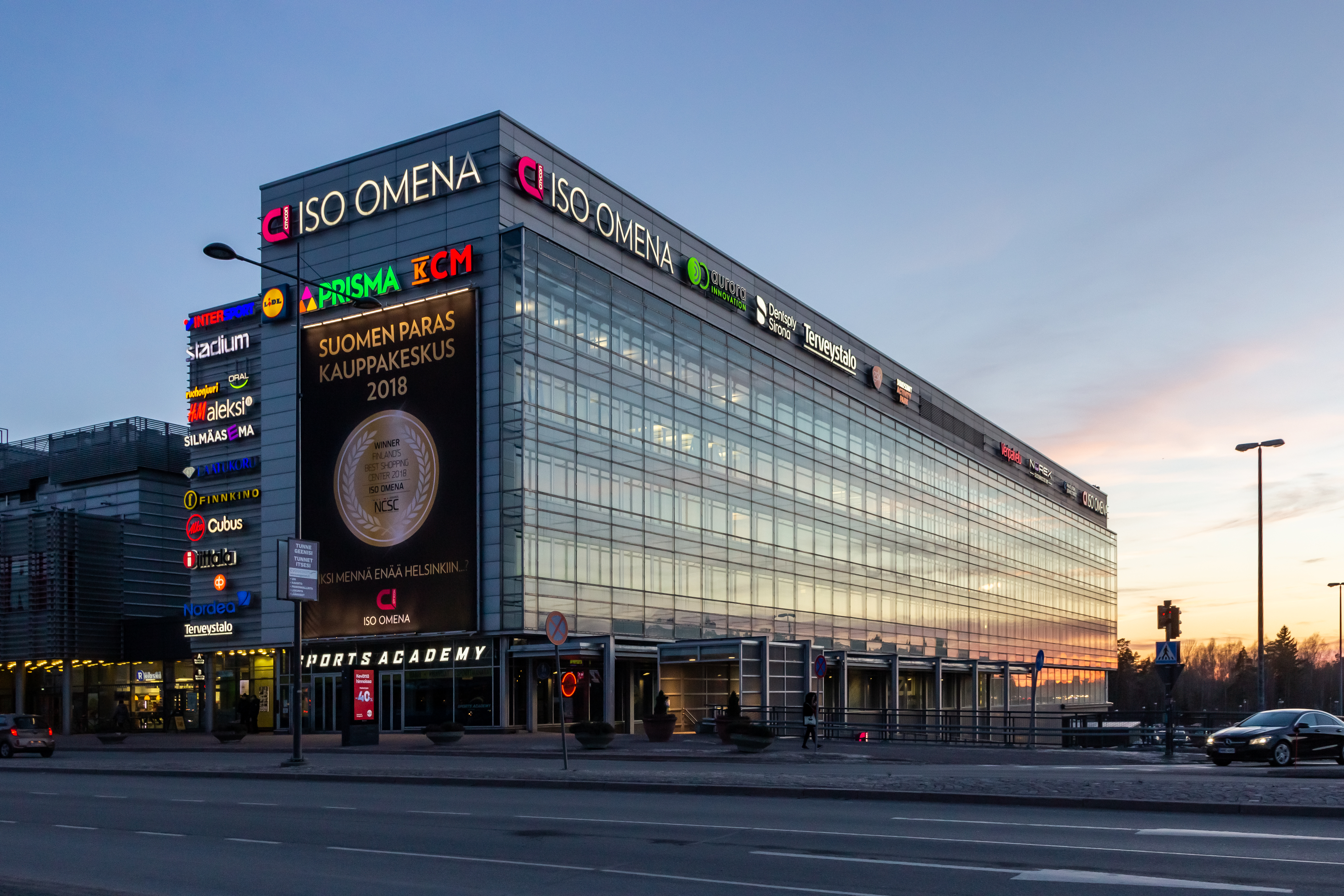
- Iso Omena
- Location: Matinkylä, Espoo, Finland
- Coordinates: 60°09′43.7″N 024°44′14.3″E
- Opened: September 24, 2001
- Owner: Citycon Oyj
- Architect: Mauri Tommila
- Num. of stores: over 200
- Floor area: 108,700 m^{2} (1,170,037 sq ft)
- Floors: 4 (3 above ground, 1 below ground)
- Parking: 2,600 parking places
- Website: www.isoomena.fi

Iso Omena (Finnish for "Big Apple") is a shopping centre in Matinkylä, Espoo, Finland, opened on September 24, 2001. The construction of Iso Omena aimed to, as far as possible, take heed of the wishes of the population of Espoo. Because of this, Iso Omena includes many centralised municipal and private services. Iso Omena also includes apartments, with a direct connection to the shopping centre. The name "Iso Omena" comes from the nickname "The Big Apple" of New York City in the United States.

Iso Omena includes over 200 businesses. The total area for rent is approximately 108,700 m^{2} (1,170,000 sq ft). The building has 3 to 4 floors, parking garages under ground and a separate parking building and an office tower.

In 2018 Iso Omena was the third largest shopping centre in Finland in terms of area, total sales and visitors. In 2023 and 2024 it reached third place in terms of sales and fourth place in terms of visitors.

== Information ==
Iso Omena opened September 24, 2001, and has had two major extensions in 2016-17. On its opening day it was the second biggest shopping centre in Finland. It is owned by Citycon. The original architect was Mauri Tommila. Its motto is "Like a small city".

The construction of Iso Omena cost a total of 500 million markka and was fiananced by the city of Espoo, the Finnish housing foundation, Aleksia and the company Destia.

Iso Omena houses over 200 businesses. It has four commercial floors and several parking levels under ground. It provides approximately 1,100 jobs. As well as businesses and restaurants, Iso Omena hosts a library, a cinema, a healthcare station and service spaces.

In February 2004 the Helsingin Osuuskauppa (HOK) and Elanto cooperatives merged, and thus the Maxi supermarket at Iso Omena was changed into a supermarket of the Prisma chain, becoming the first Prisma supermarket in Espoo.

Iso Omena has sales of approximately 390 million Euro per year and approximately 17 million visitors per year.

=== Largest businesses ===
- K-Citymarket: 10,594 m^{2} (114,030 sq ft)
- Prisma: 10,249 m^{2} (110,320 sq ft)
- Kirjasto Omena: 2,443 m^{2} (26,300 sq ft)
- Aleksi 13: 1,609 m^{2} (17,320 sq ft)
- Stadium: 1,595 m^{2} (17,170 sq ft)
- HOK, restaurants: 1,316 m^{2} (14,170 sq ft)

=== Area ===
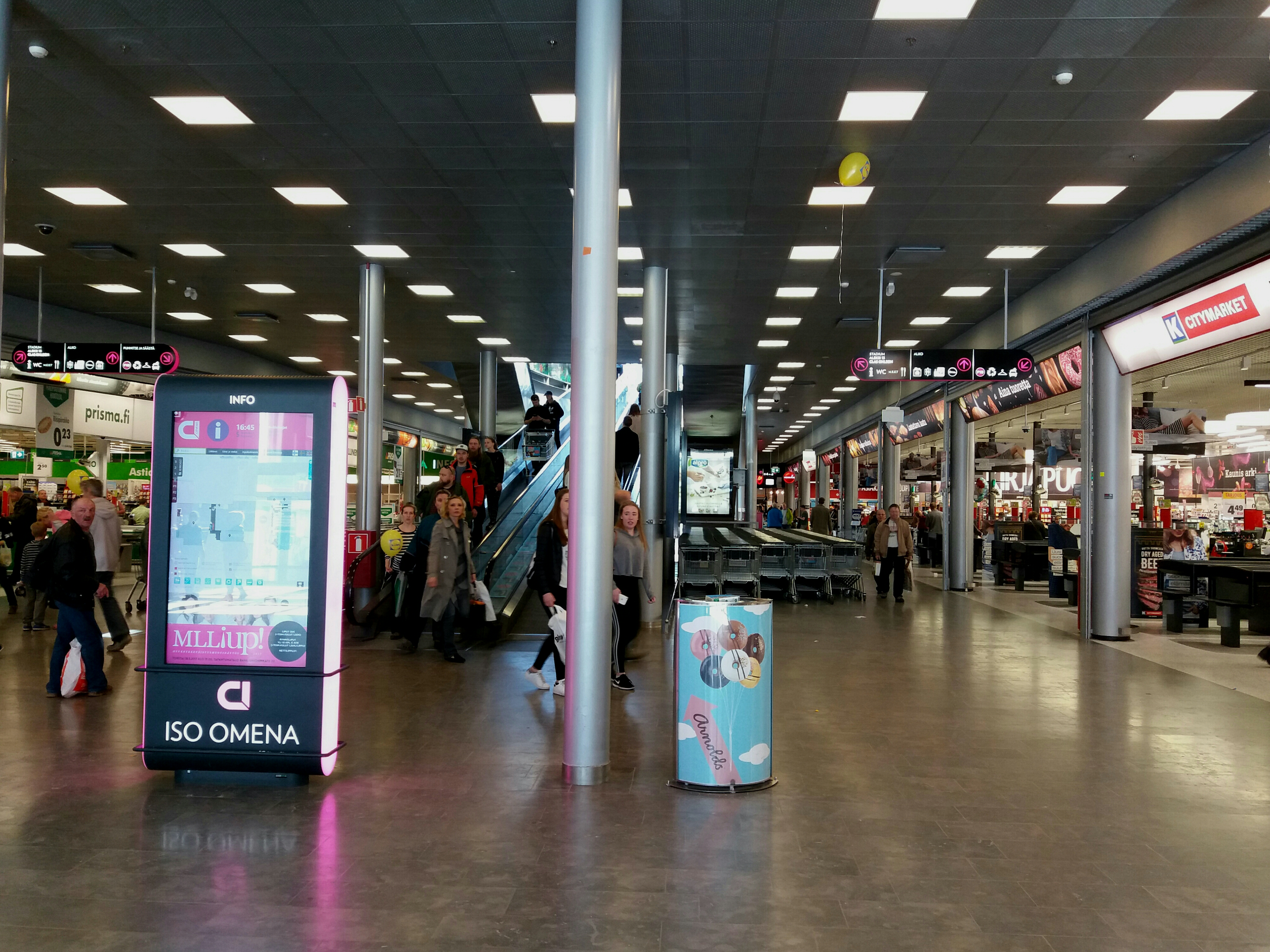
Market level

It has a Total area of 166,000 m^{2} (1,790,000 sq ft) with area for rent comprising a shopping centre of 108,700 m^{2} (1,170,000 sq ft) offices of 8,000 m^{2} (86,000 sq ft) and Senior apartments of 7,000 m^{2} (75,000 sq ft) (95 apartments).

Parking

It has approximately 2,600 parking spaces in total.

== Services ==
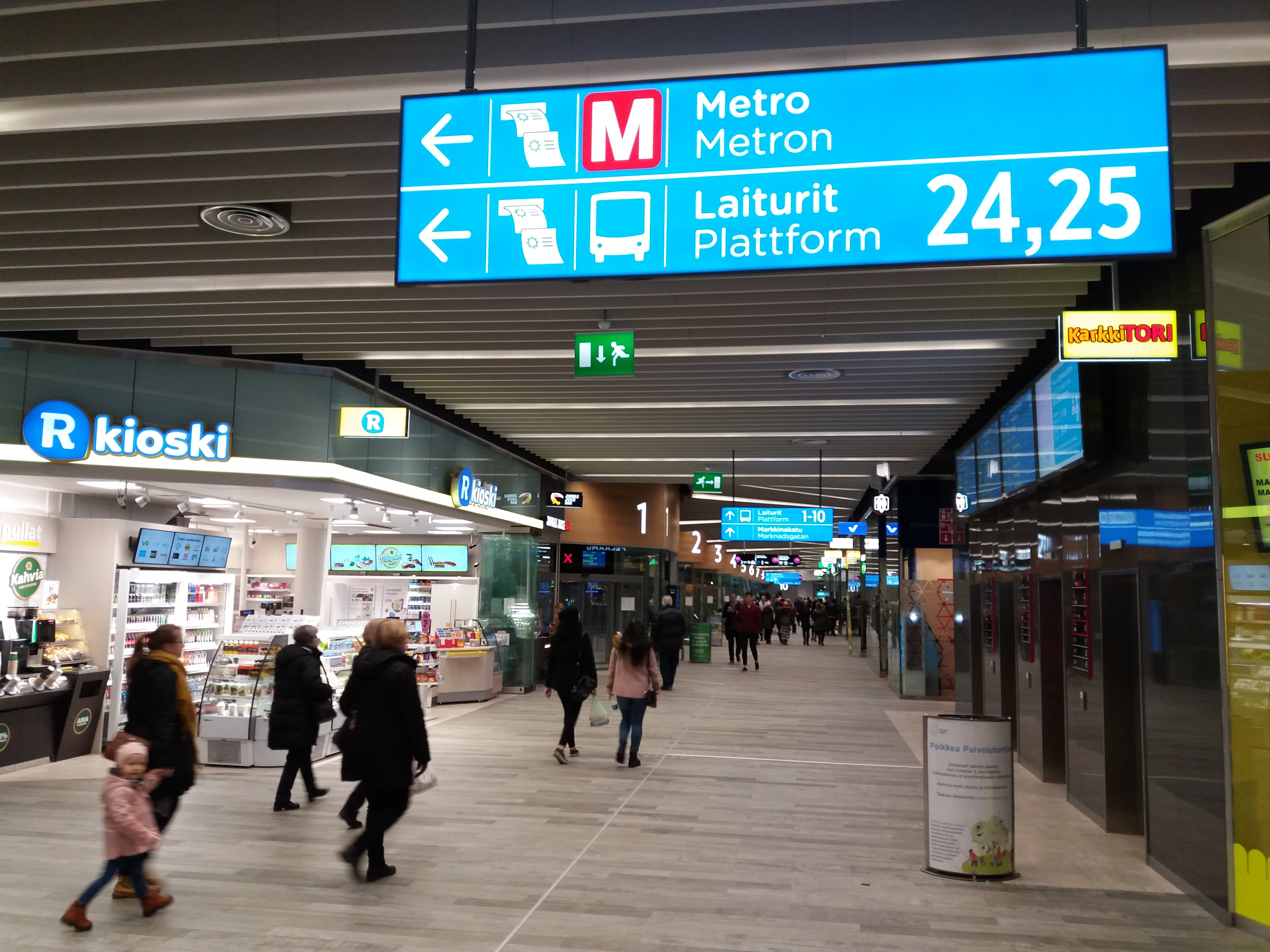
Bus terminal

Services offered include: library, Espoo city common service centre, ticket service and medical and dental health service, chapel, KELA, office of the Finnish employment bureau, and a movie theatre.

== 2023 excessive force incident ==
In early 2023 there was an incident at Iso Omena where security guards were escorting a 35-year-old woman out of the shopping centre. The incident resulted in the woman's death. The police investigation was finished in August 2023 and according to the police, the cause of the woman's death had not been choking.

On 22 September 2023 the prosecutor announced that all six security guards at the incident had been charged with manslaughter. The suspects were aged 19 to 24, while the victim had been 35 years old. All of the suspects denied being guilty of a crime. The date of the main hearing has not yet been announced.

== Connections ==
Iso Omena can be reached by metro, buses, car, bikes and by foot. The Matinkylä metro station and locan bus terminal is located directly under the southern part of Iso Omena. Iso Omena can be additionally reached by all buses travelling along Länsiväylä to or past Matinkylä, and by buses passing over Piispansilta.

== Gallery ==
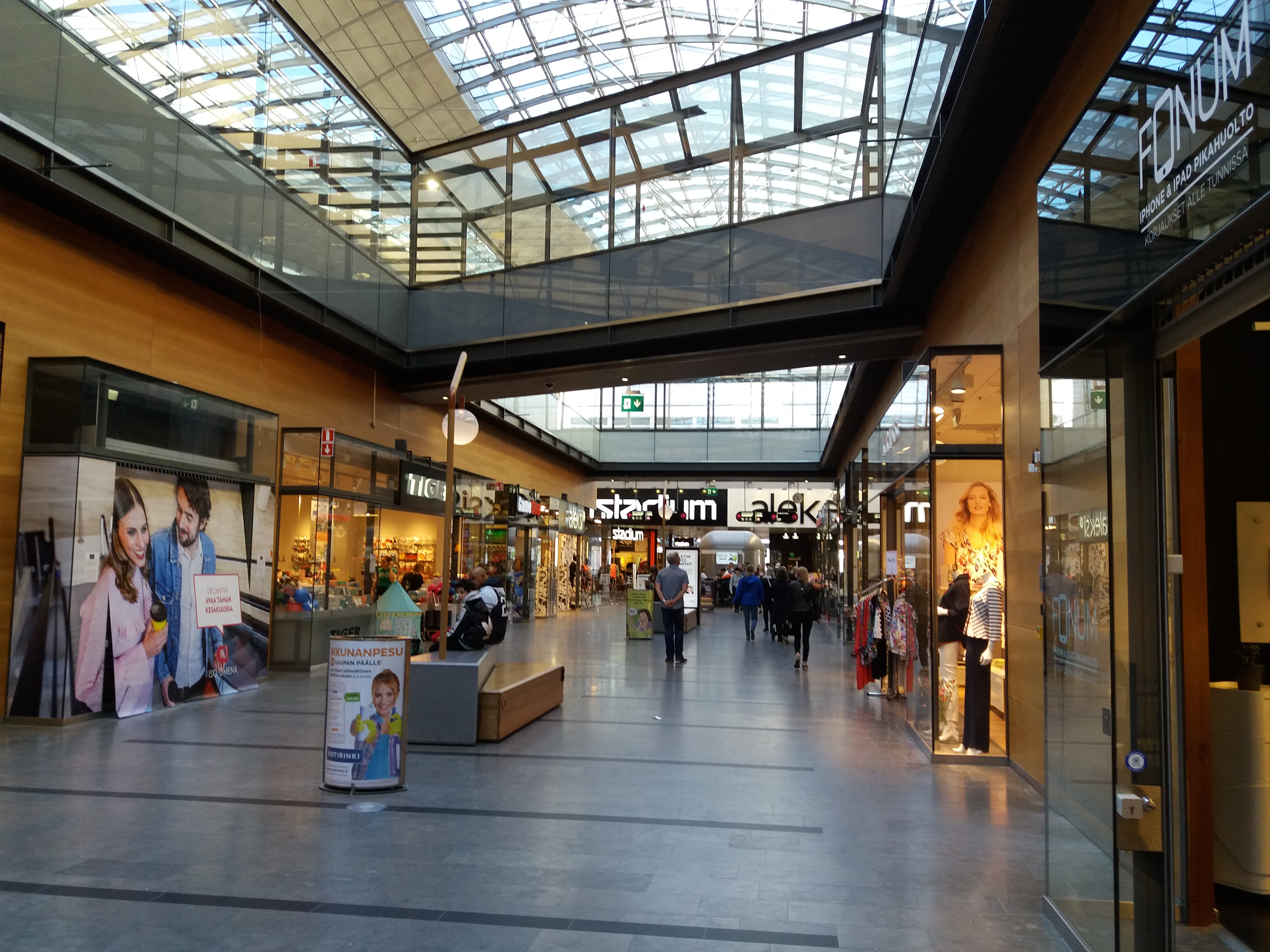
The main market level

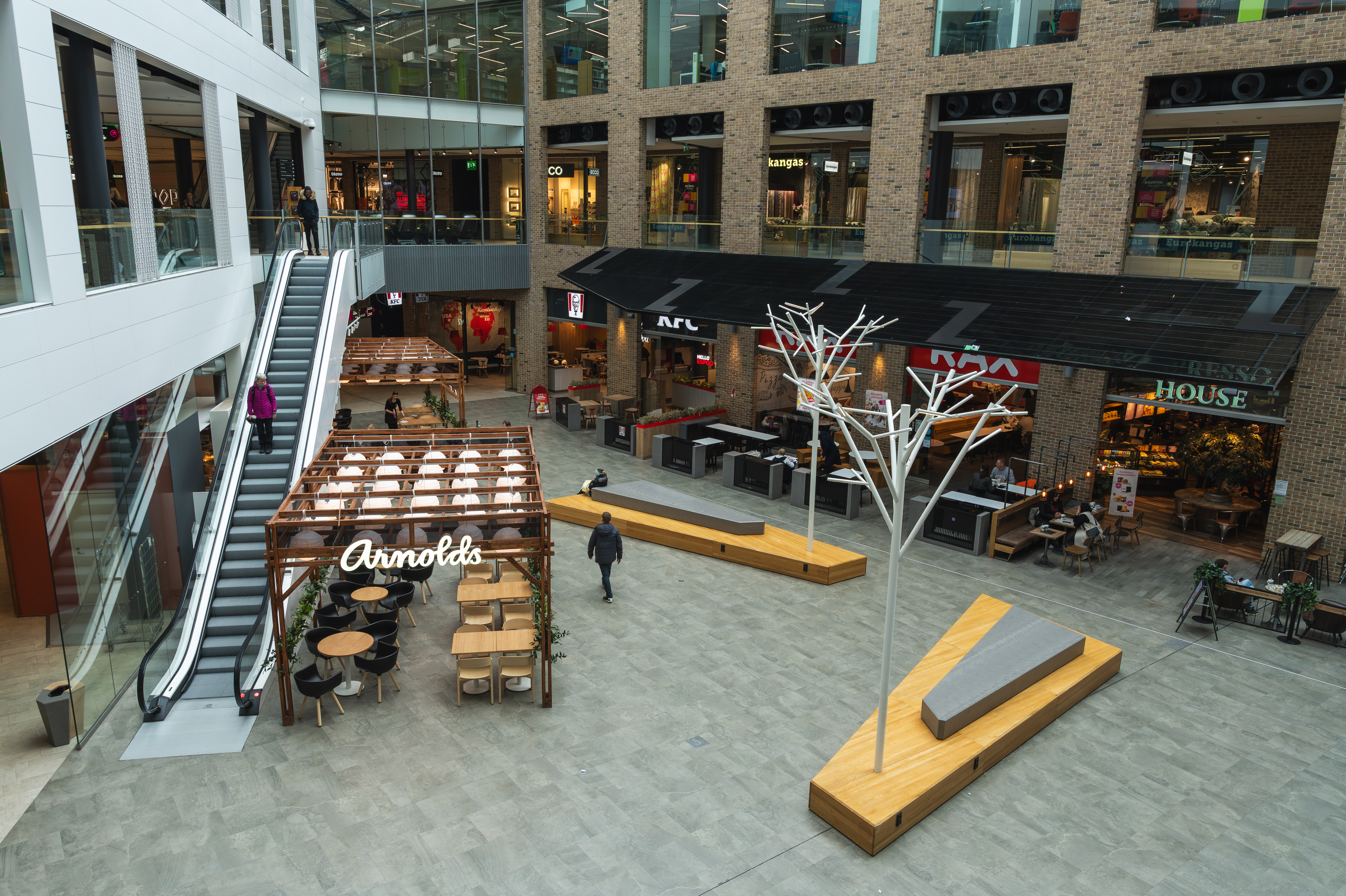
The M.E.E.T. square at the extension part

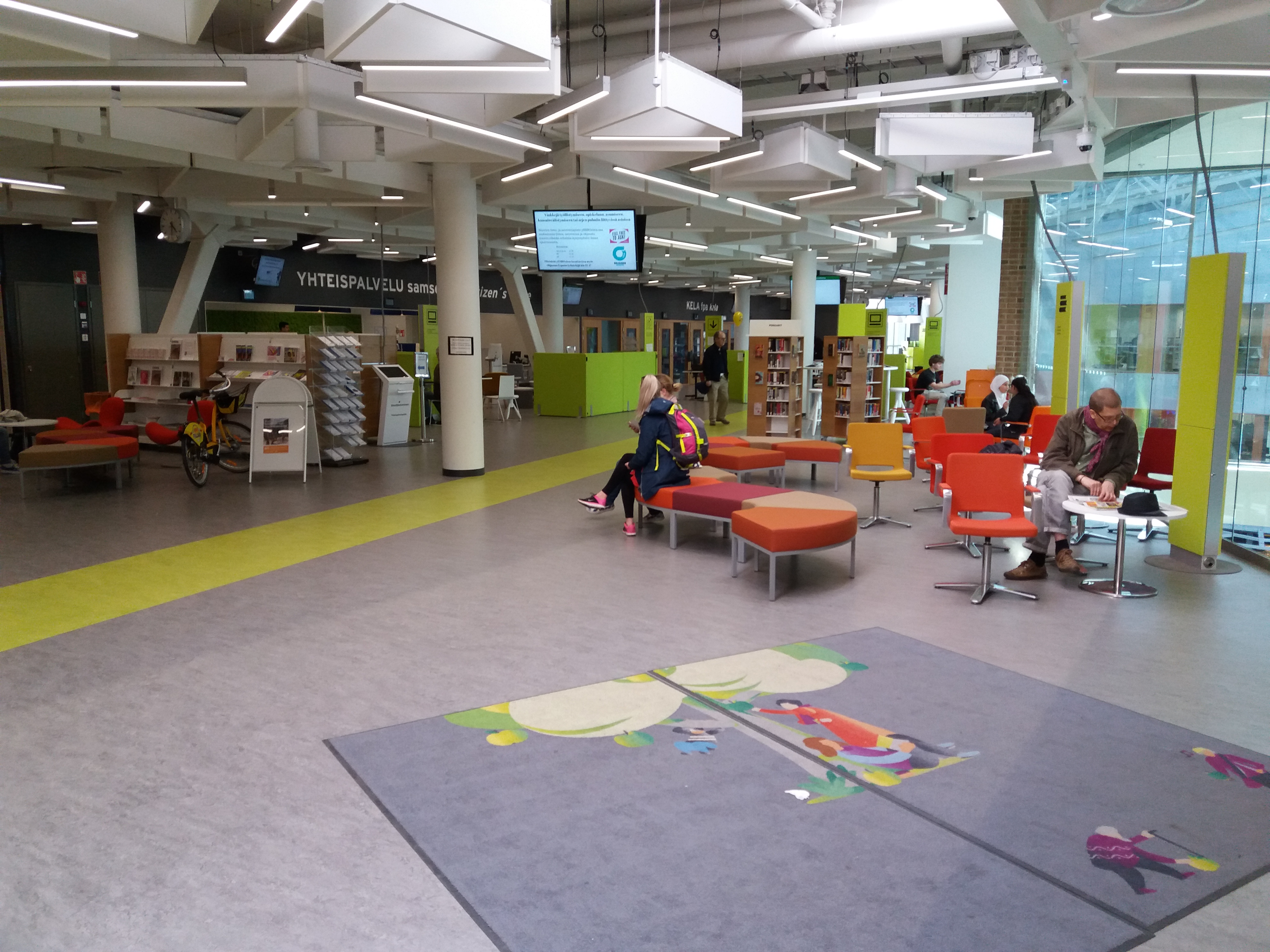
The service square

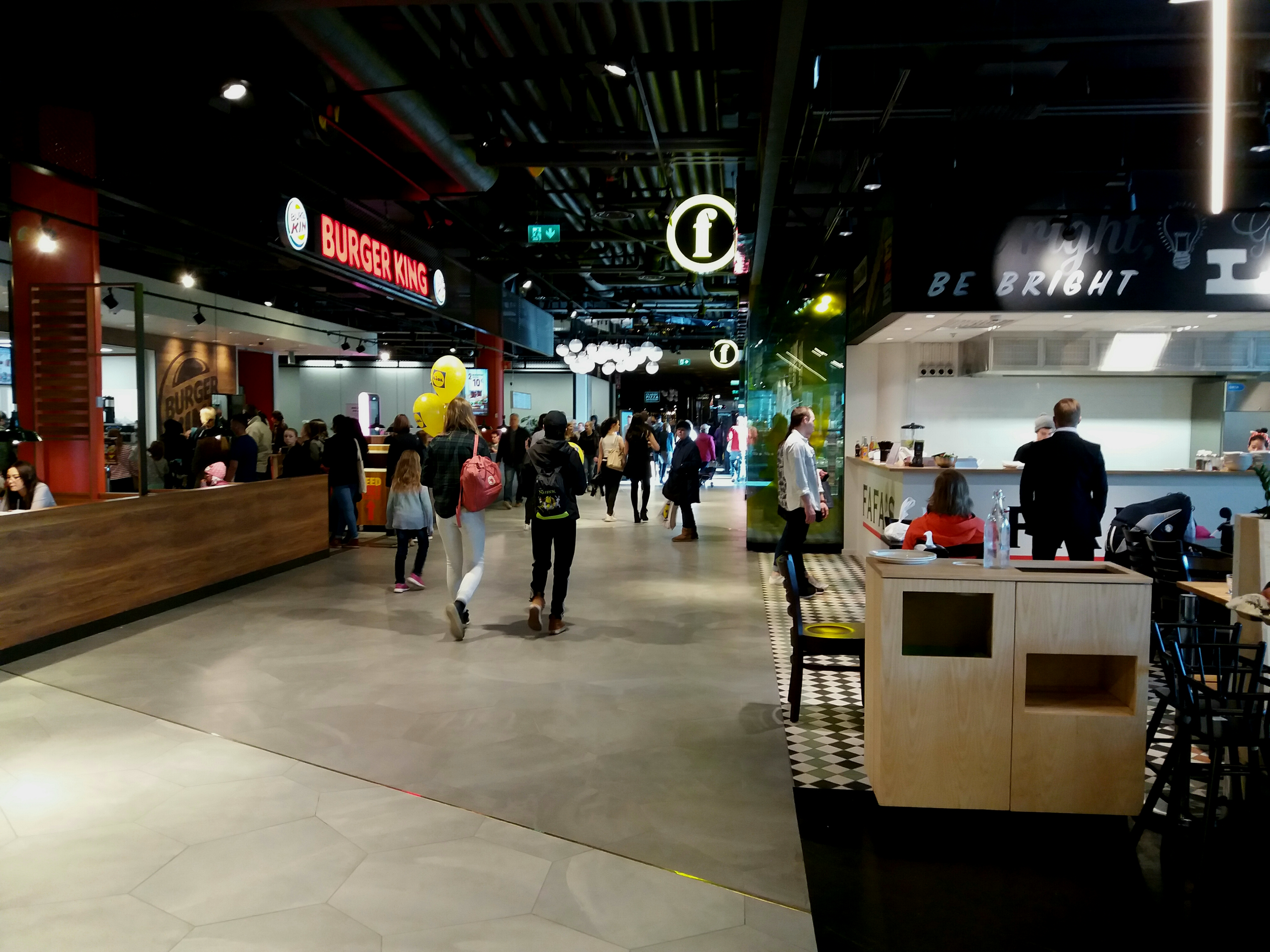
The M.E.E.T. restaurant area at the extension part

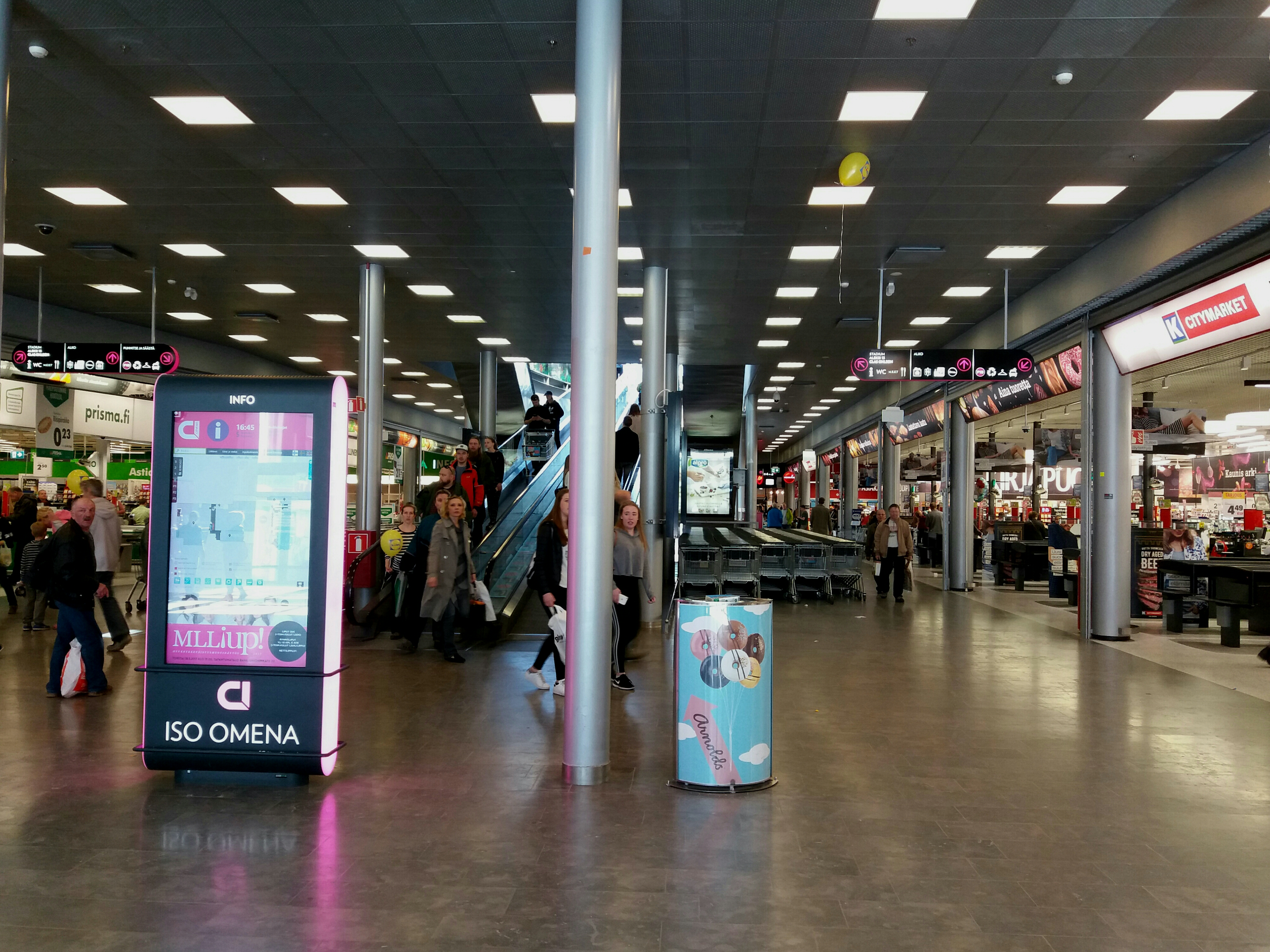
The supermarket level

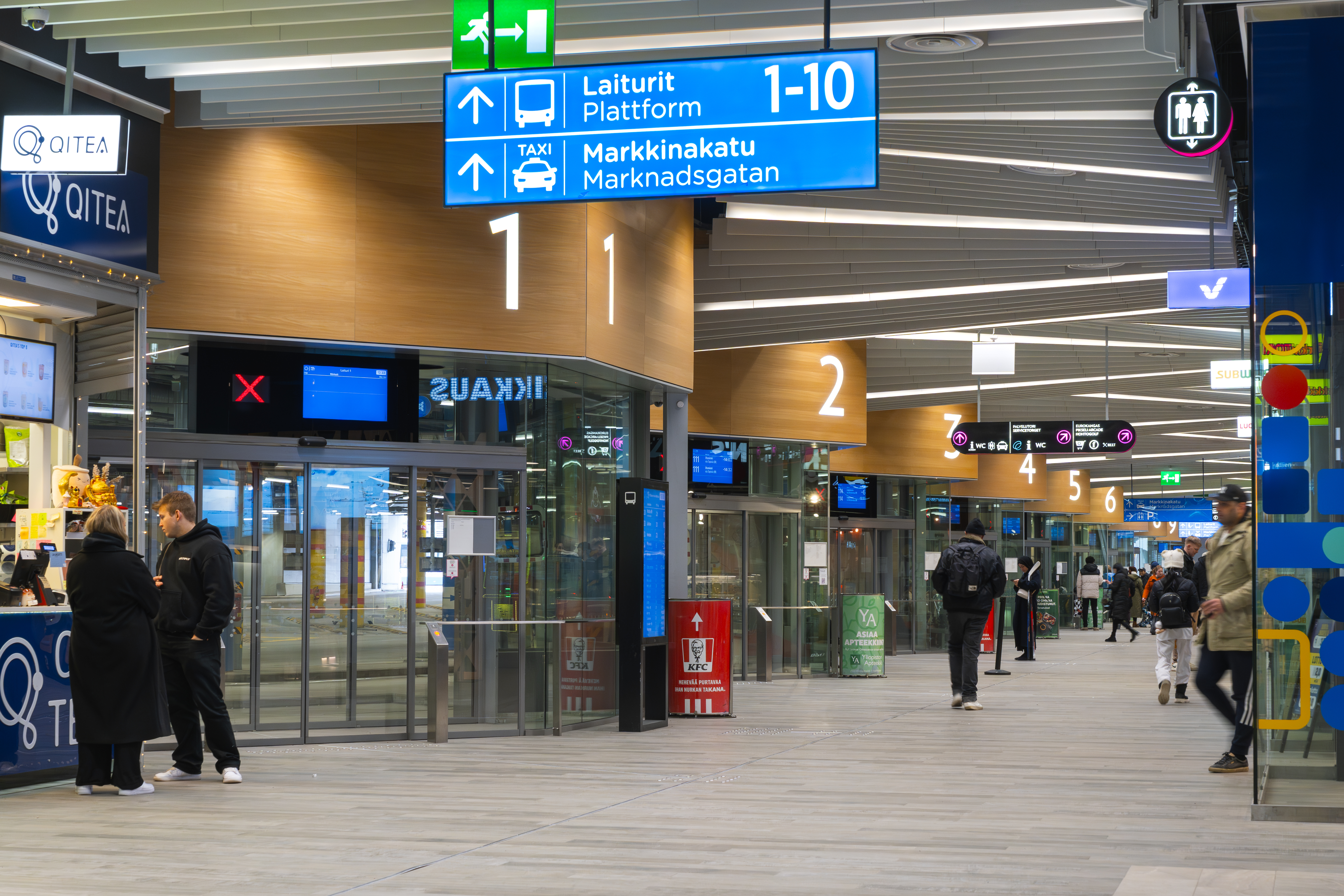
The bus terminal
