= Cedarbrae Centre =

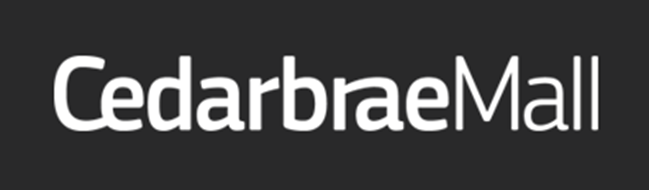

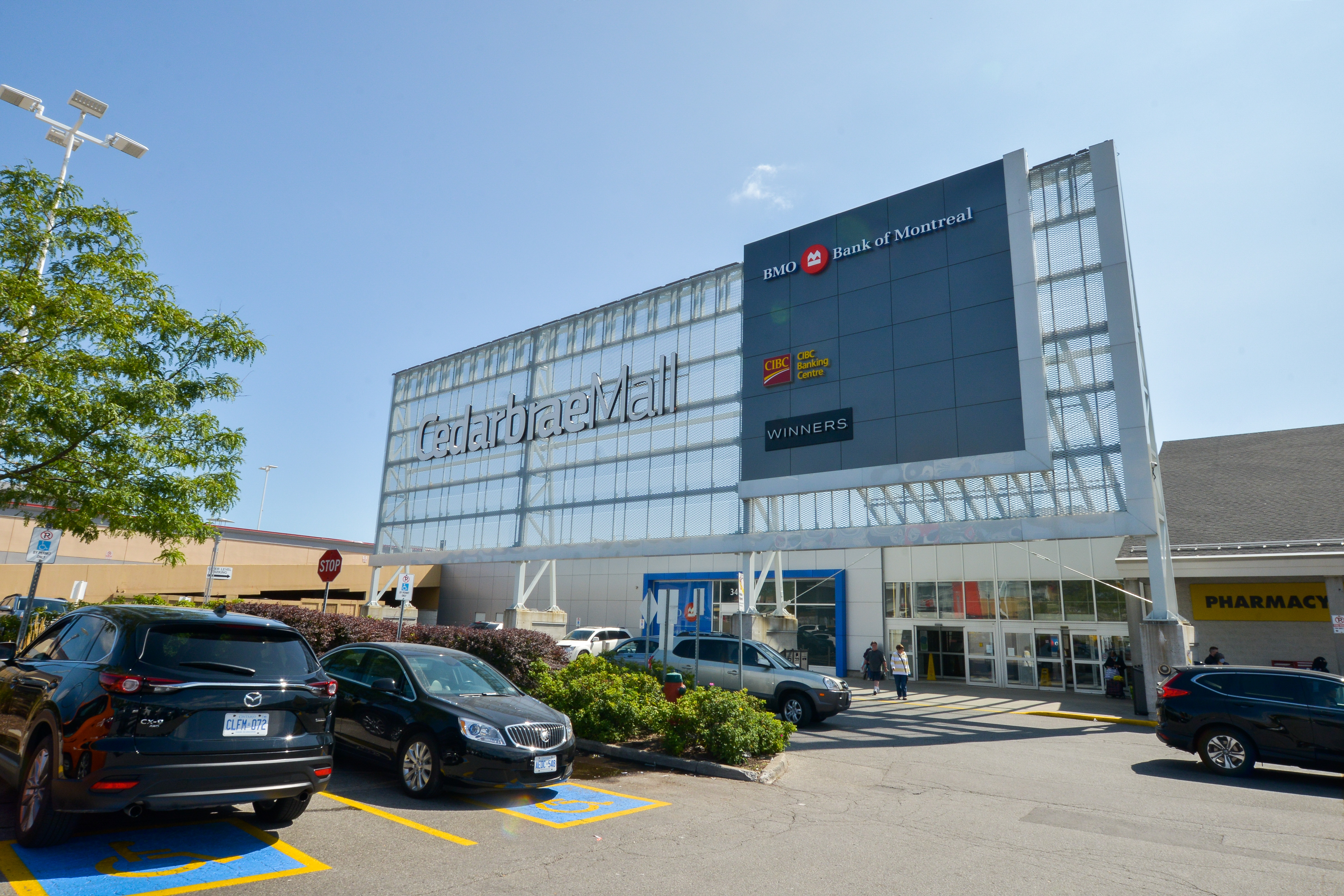
- Location: Toronto, Ontario, Canada
- Coordinates: 43.758°N 79.229°W
- Address: 3495 Lawrence Avenue East
- Opened: 1962
- Manager: First Capital REIT Inc.
- Num. of stores: 60+
- Num. of anchor tenants: 2
- Floor area: 548,000 sq ft (50,911 m^{2})
- Floors: 3
- Website: cedarbraecentre.com

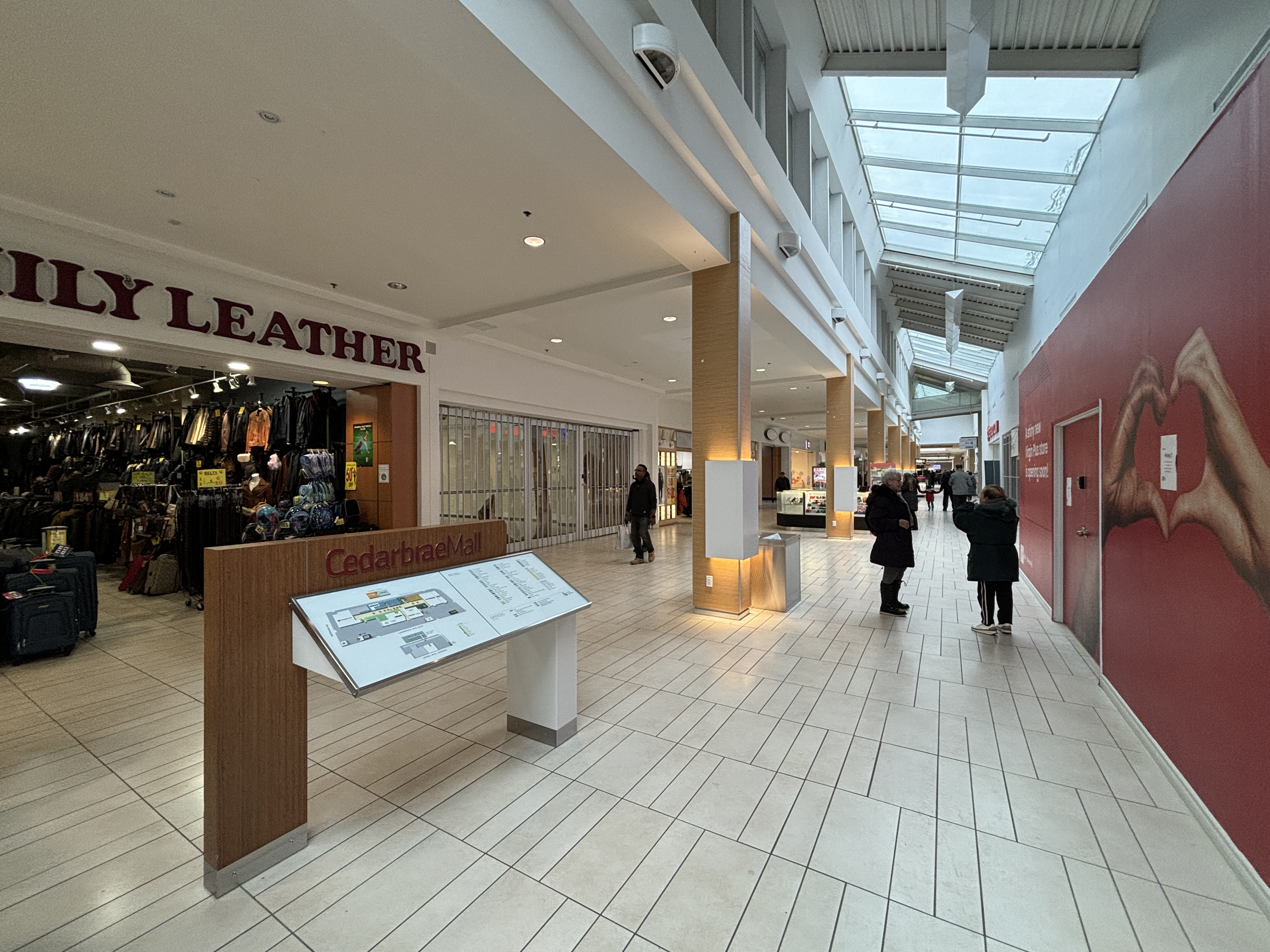
Interior of the mall

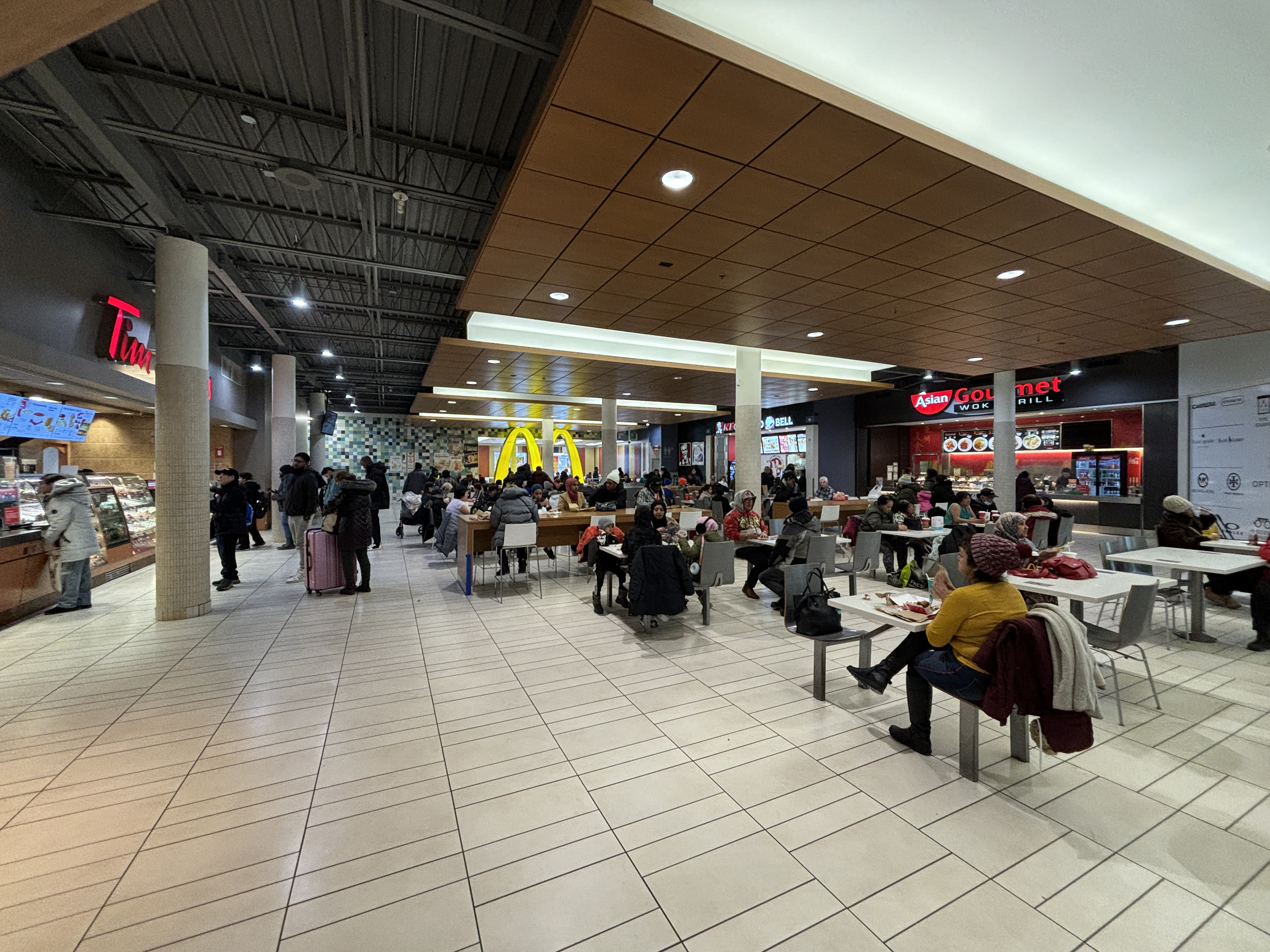
Food Court

Cedarbrae Centre, formerly known as Cedarbrae Mall, is a shopping mall in Toronto, Ontario, Canada. It is located at the corner of Markham Road and Lawrence Avenue East in the Scarborough district. It is anchored by No Frills and Canadian Tire.

== History ==
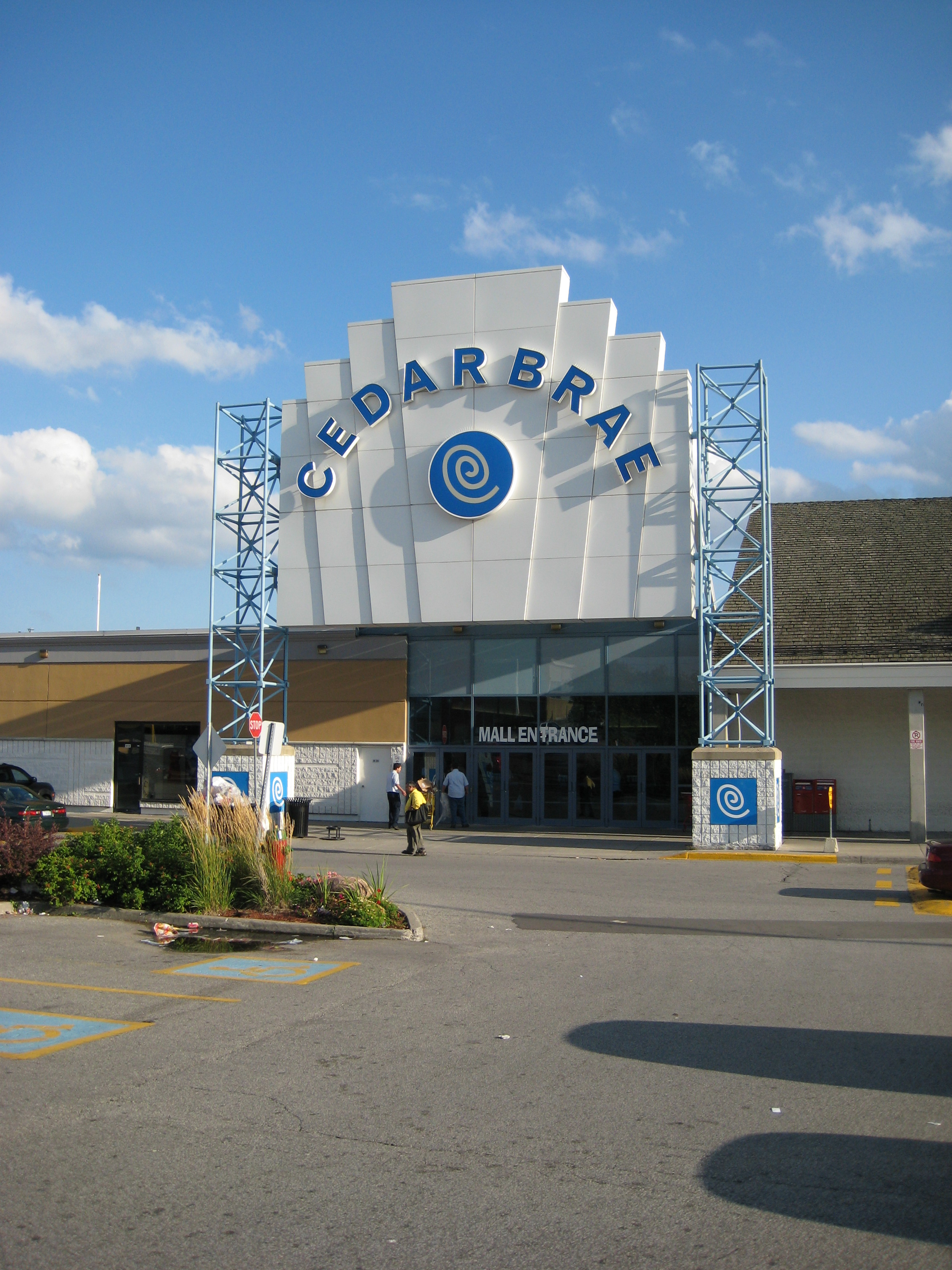
West entrance to mall, prior to renovations

The mall opened in 1962 as a plaza and was anchored by a Woolworth's, a Zellers store, a Steinberg's and a Simpsons. In 1991, the Simpsons location closed to become a Hudson's Bay. Renovations to Cedarbrae Mall would soon replace the original anchors, and bring a larger Zellers store, as well as additional retail space to the east and west sides of the mall. A No Frills, Canadian Tire, Toys "R" Us, as well as a renovated food court area and both an upper and lower floor were the next few major events for the mall.

In August 1996, the mall was acquired by the Centrefund Realty Corporation. At the time of purchase, Centrefund announced it would begin expansion and renovation with a total redevelopment budget of approximately CA$20 million. The Canadian portion of Centrefund changed its name to First Capital REIT Corporation in 2001.

In 2012, the Zellers store was acquired by Target, but later sold to Walmart Canada and opened as Walmart in late 2012. A Jysk store also opened around this time, to the west of No Frills, which is not part of the actual mall.

During mid-2013, the mall went through major renovations done by Cinric Construction, which would include the full replacement of the interior and exterior lighting, automatic and energy-efficient washrooms, floor and ceiling finishes, a repaved parking lot, an enhanced food court, and the rebranding of the mall. By late 2013, most of the work was completed, except for final touches such as carpets and mall seating. The food court, named Food Emporium, finished renovations slightly later.

Walmart closed permanently on January 31, 2019. It has been filled by new tenants in Q2 2024.

== Incidents ==
On December 9, 2008, a 21-year-old victim was taken to hospital after he received a knife wound to the neck at around 4:15 pm. The suspect, 21-year-old Jamaal Williams, was arrested and charged with assault with a weapon and aggravated assault.

On June 3, 2017, Rehab Dughmosh, believed to be wearing an ISIS bandanna, was arrested after attempting to attack people with a knife outside the Canadian Tire.

== See also ==
- List of shopping malls in Toronto
- List of largest shopping centres in Canada
