= Gazit-Globe =

Global real estate company

Gazit-Globe Ltd.
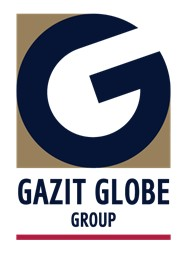

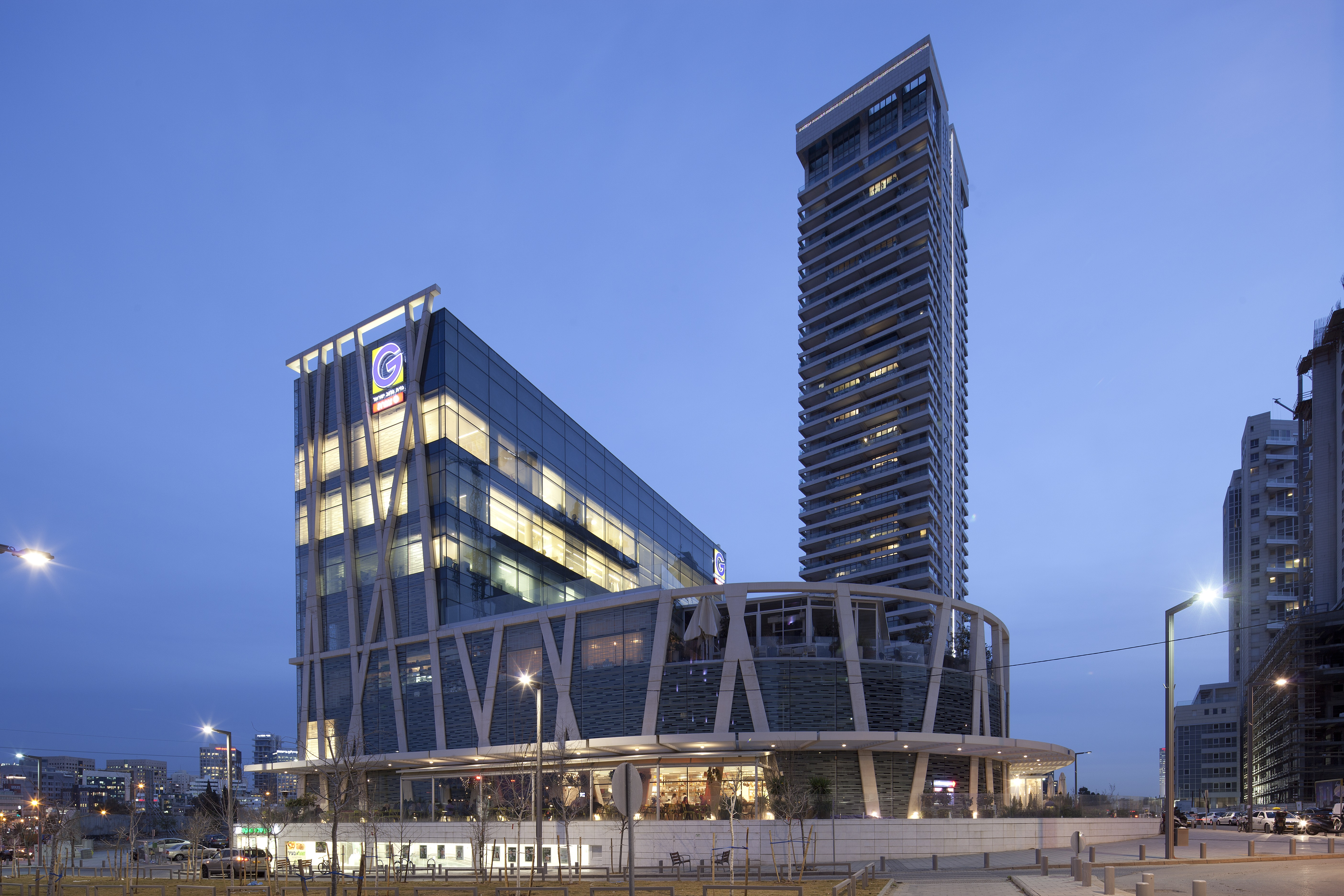
- G Tzamere, 10 Nissim Aloni St. Tel Aviv
- Type: Public
- Traded as: TASE: GZT
- Industry: Real estate, shopping centers
- Founded: 1982; 44 years ago
- Headquarters: Tel-Aviv, Israel
- Key people: Chaim Katzman, founder and CEO
- Revenue: ▲₪ 2,750 million (2019)
- Operating income: ▲₪ 1,438 million (2019)
- Number of employees: 800~ (2019)
- Subsidiaries: Atruim Real Estate, Citycon, Gazit Horizons, Gazit Brazil
- Website: www.gazitglobe.com

G City formerly Gazit Globe (Hebrew: גזית-גלוב) is a leading global real estate company focused on the ownership, development, and management of income-producing properties for mixed use including retail, office and residential located in densely populated urban cities.

Gazit Globe is listed on the Tel Aviv Stock Exchange TASE: GZT and is part of the Tel Aviv 35 Index. As of September 30, 2020, The Group owns and operates 104 properties, with a gross leasable area of approximately 2.5 million square meters (approximately 27 million square feet) and a total value of approximately $11 billion.

== History ==
Gazit-Globe was founded in 1982. Since May 1991, the company has been controlled by Chaim Katzman, who trained as a lawyer and in 1979 moved to South Florida, where he became involved in the development and management of commercial and residential real estate. During the 1980s he also started developing his real estate business in Israel, and was able to consolidate his holding in Gazit-Globe, at the time a corporate shell with no business operations.

The holding in Gazit-Globe enabled Katzman to draw investors to help him acquire additional retail centers, and it became a vehicle to raise capital for further property and business acquisitions.

In 1992, Katzman formed Equity One as a partially owned subsidiary of Gazit that operate as a real estate investment trust (REIT). Equity One grew gradually during the mid-1990s and in 1998 the company had an initial public offering on the New York Stock Exchange, Gazit-Globe retained partial ownership of Equity One after the business was spun off as a stand-alone company. Going public provided Equity One with access to US capital markets and hastened its growth. Equity One won over investors seeking steady dividend income.

In 2004 Gazit acquired 33% of Citycon, a Finnish public company which focuses on commercial real estate in the Nordic region. In the following years Gazit increased its stake in the company to 47%.

In August 2008 Gazit-Globe finalised the takeover of the troubled European property developer Meinl European Land (MELV.VI.), Gazit together with Citigroup jointly invested 800 million euros in Meinl Land. The move strengthened Gazit's foothold in the Eastern European and Russian markets. Following the takeover, Meinl's name was changed to Atrium European Real Estate Limited and a new board of directors and management was appointed.

In December 2011, Gazit-Globe had an initial public offering on the New York Stock Exchange, which raised US$81.0 million in gross proceeds. Its stock is traded under the ticker symbol "GZT".

In October 2013, Gazit-Globe listed its shares on the Toronto Stock Exchange under the ticker symbol "GZT".

Gazit-Globe voluntarily delisted from the Toronto Stock Exchange on September 27, 2018, and from the New York Stock Exchange on March 11, 2019.

== Major holdings ==
=== United States ===
- Gazit Horizons (100%) - Wholly owned private subsidiary is engaged in the acquisition of income-producing properties with potential for development or redevelopment, with an emphasis in densely populated areas in major cities across the US, particularly in New York, Boston, Philadelphia and Miami.

=== Canada ===
- Gazit Tripllle (60%) - In November 2019, the company established a new joint venture to locate, acquire and manage mixed-use properties in densely populated areas of major cities in Canada, focusing at this time, on the city of Toronto.

=== Europe ===
- Citycon Oyj (48.9%) - is listed on the OMX Nordic Stock Exchange (OMX: CTY1S). Citycon owns, develops and operates shopping centers and commercial properties. Citycon is the market leader in Finland, with strong positions is Sweden and Norway and a firm foothold in Denmark and Estonia.
- Atrium European Real Estate Limited (73%) - is no longer listed on the Euronext as well as on Vienna Stock Exchange (ATX/Euronext: ARTS). Atrium specializes in the acquisition, development and management of shopping centers in Central and Eastern Europe.

=== Israel ===
- Gazit-Globe Israel assets division is active in rental, management, development and improvement of commercial centers, which include, inter alia, malls and open shopping centers. The shopping centers serves as shopping, leisure and entertainment centers for their customers.

=== Brazil ===
- Gazit Brazil (100%) - Wholly owned private subsidiary, active in the acquisition, development and management of shopping centers in Sao-Paulo, Brazil.
