= Shopping centre Valkea =

- Kauppakeskus Valkea
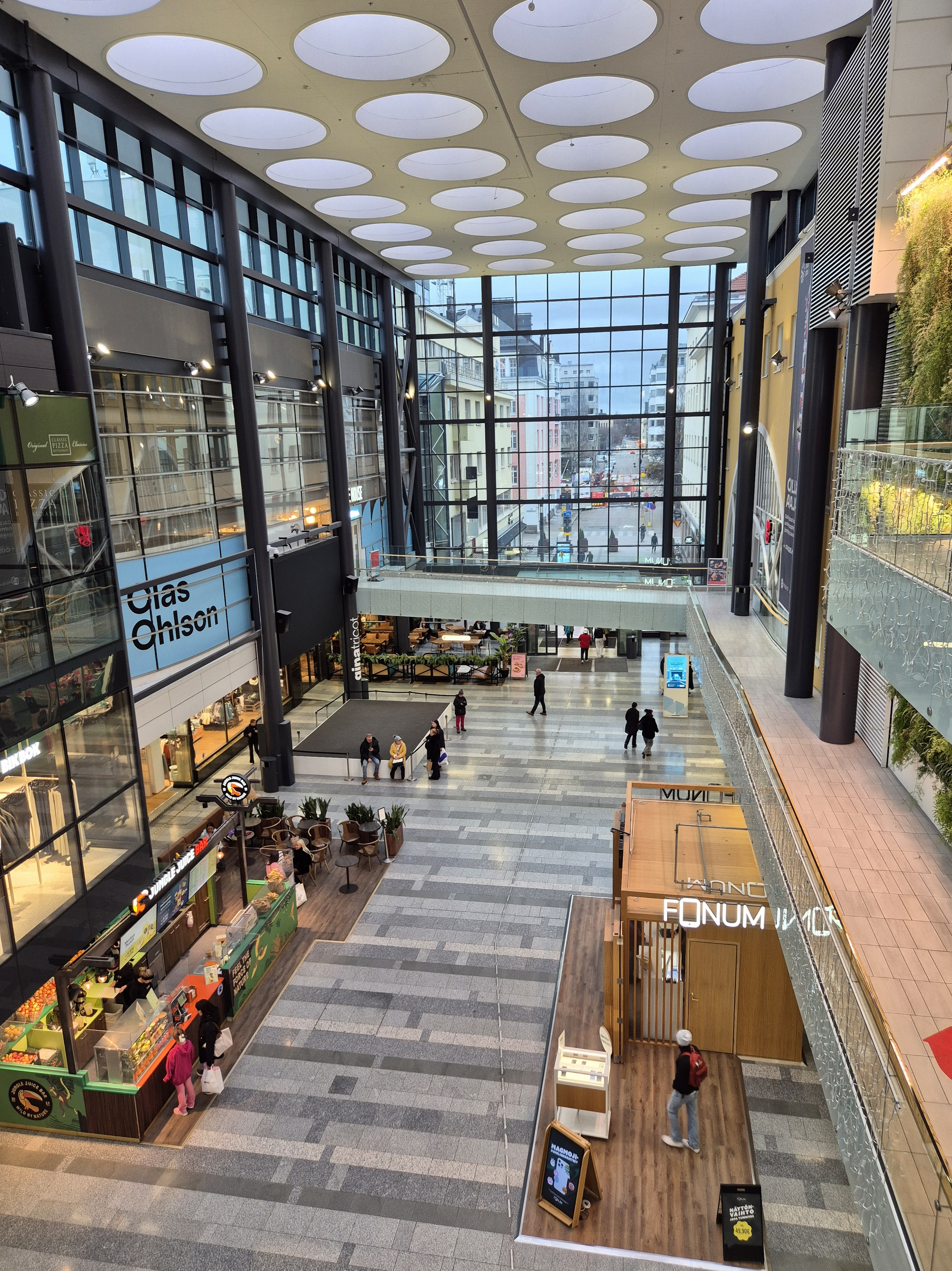
- Shopping centre's summer street in 2025
- Location: Oulu, Finland
- Coordinates: 65°00′41″N 025°28′22″E
- Opened: April 14, 2016
- Owner: Osuuskauppa Arina
- Num. of stores: ~60
- Floor area: 25,000 m^{2} (270,000 sq ft)
- Parking: ~70
- Website: kauppakeskusvalkea.fi

Kauppakeskus Valkea is a shopping mall in Oulu, Finland. The mall includes about 50 shops, summer street and 66 apartments. When it was completed, the building was the tallest residential building in downtown Oulu. The pedestrian street section was designed to be a covered and year-round warm public space, which is unique in northern conditions. The shopping center is heated with geothermal energy.

Construction costs were approximately 50 million euros. Main contractor was Skanska. The mall was opened on 14 April 2016. The opening weekend gathered over 80 000 people to the mall.

== Stores ==
=== International chains ===
- Bik Bok
- Blue Tomato
- Carlings
- Clas Ohlson
- Cubus
- Flying Tiger Copenhagen
- Gina Tricot
- Glitter
- Granit
- Instrumentarium
- Intersport
- Jack & Jones
- Normal
- Polarn O. Pyret
- Synsam
- Telia
- Vero Moda
- Volt
- XS Lelut

=== Finnish shops/chains ===
- Chocosomnia
- Elisa
- Fonum
- Makia
- Marimekko
- Reima
- Silmäasema
- Sokos
- SOL Pesulapalvelut
- Suomalainen Kirjakauppa

=== Restaurants and cafés ===
- Arnolds
- Bacaro Doppio
- Classic Pizza
- Coffee House
- Friends & Brgrs
- Hanko Aasia
- Jungle Juice Bar
- La Torrefazione
- Picnic
- Rosso
- Seoul Good
- Wok's

=== Other services ===
- Budbee
- Pakettipiste
- Original Sokos Hotel Arina conference rooms
- Posti Group parcel unit
- ValuuttaOtto

== 2024 stabbings ==
The shopping centre Valkea was the site of two stabbing incidents in June 2024.

The first incident happened on 13 June 2024 at about 18:30 Finnish time. The suspect, Juhani Sebastian Lämsä, was identified as a far-right activist with a Neo-Nazi background and was arrested on the spot. The victim was a 12-year-old boy.

The second incident happened on 18 June 2024 at about 21:25 Finnish time. The victim was a 26-year-old man.

== See also ==
- Zeppelin (shopping centre)
