= Hotel Torni Tampere =

Skyscraper hotel in Tampere, Finland

Solo Sokos Hotel Torni Tampere
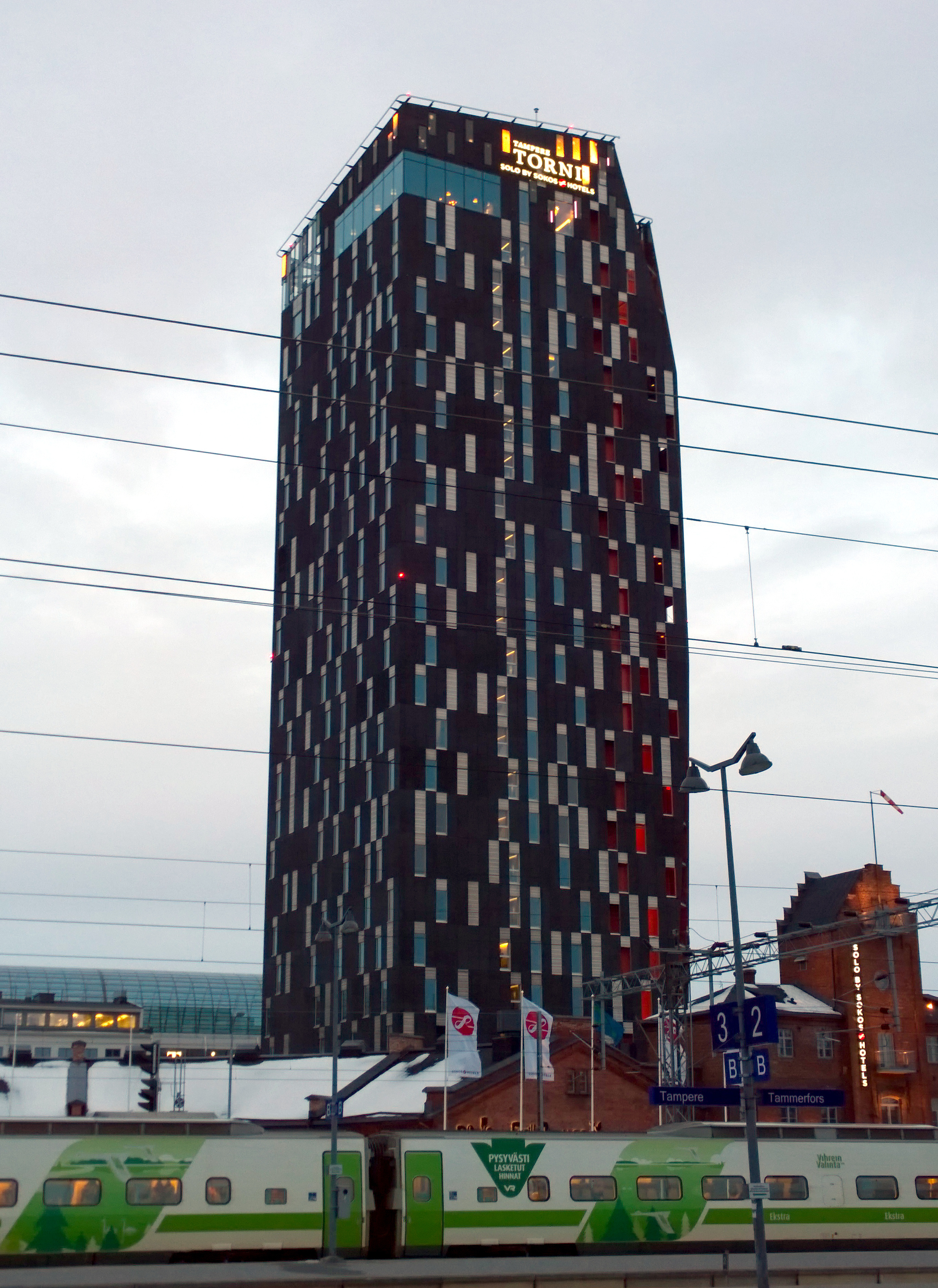

- Location within Finland
- Hotel chain: Sokos Hotels

General information
- Location: Tulli, Tampere, Finland, Ratapihankatu 43
- Coordinates: 61°29′49″N 023°46′30″E
- Opening: 2014

Height
- Height: 88.5 m (290 ft)

Technical details
- Floor count: 25

Design and construction
- Architect: Sampo Valjus

Other information
- Number of rooms: 305
- Number of restaurants: 3

Website
- sokoshotels.fi

Hotel Torni Tampere (officially Solo Sokos Hotel Torni Tampere) is a 25-storey hotel in Tampere, Finland. It was completed in 2014. Hotel Torni Tampere is the tallest hotel building in Finland, and the second highest overall building in Finland after Majakka in Kalasatama, Helsinki.

On the top floor of the hotel building is the Moro Sky Bar, which is the highest bar and terrace in all of Finland.

== See also ==
- Hotel Ilves
- List of tallest buildings in Finland
- Tampere Central Station
- Tullintori
