= Vihreäsaari =

Island and neighborhood in the country of Finland

Coordinates: 65.008°N 25.411°E

- District of Oulu
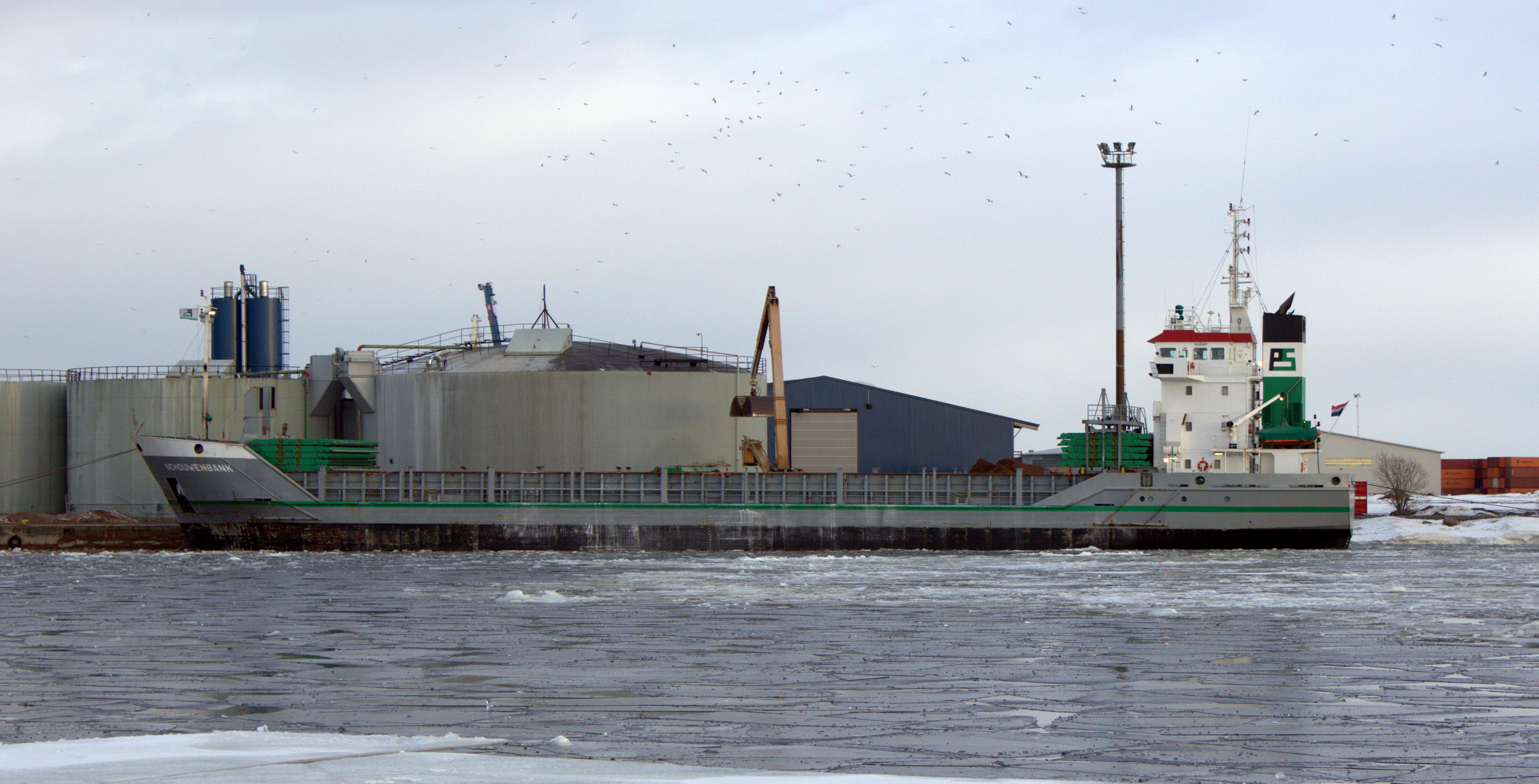
- Interactive map of Vihreäsaari
- Country: Finland
- City: Oulu
- Areas of Oulu: Tuira area

Population (2013)
  - Total: 0
- Postal code: 90500

Vihreäsaari is an uninhabited island and a neighbourhood in the Tuira area in the city of Oulu, Finland. It is separated from the Hietasaari island by the Johteensalmi strait.

Most of the area of the district is used by the facilities of the Port of Oulu. The Vihreäsaari harbour is the most important oil dock in the city.
