= Toppilansaari =

- District of Oulu
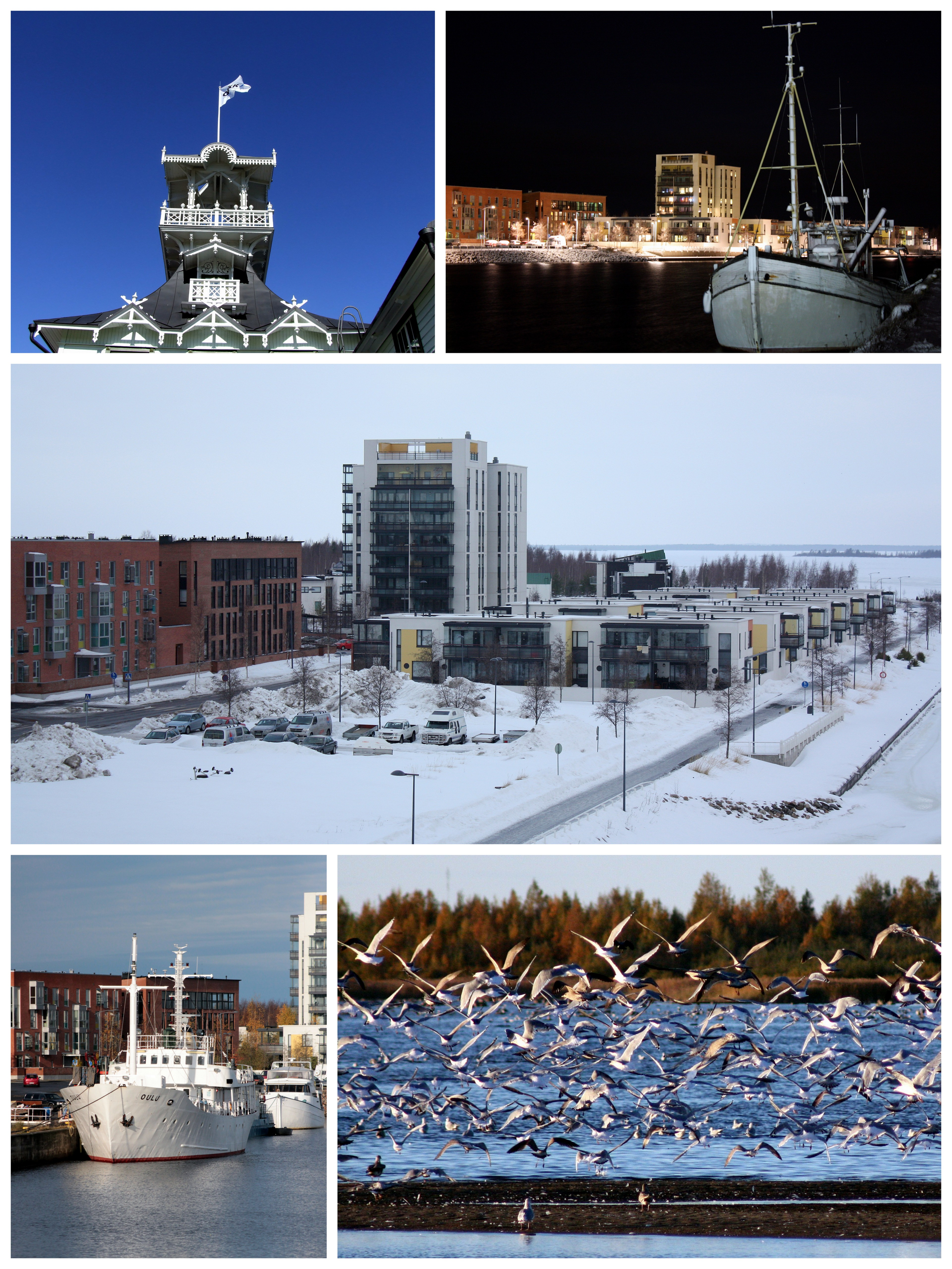
- Interactive map of Toppilansaari
- Country: Finland
- City: Oulu
- Areas of Oulu: Tuira area

Population (2013)
  - Total: 1 673
- Postal code: 90510

Toppilansaari is a neighbourhood in the Tuira area in the city of Oulu, Finland. It is located on the south side of the Toppilansalmi strait. Toppilansaari was separated from the Hietasaari district while it was rezoned to residential development in the early 2000s. The westernmost part of the neighbourhood was the location for the Finnish Housing Fair in 2005. The Möljä Bridge over the Toppilansalmi strait connects Toppilansaari with the Toppila neighbourhood. The bridge was completed in 2012.

The Toppilansaari has been an island before, but it has connected into Mustasaari island due to the post-glacial rebound. The Toppila harbour used to occupy both sides of the Toppilansalmi Strait. The harbour has been closed for commercial traffic in 2012, but the activity has ceased since the 1990s. Toppilansaari has also been a historic villa area of which a few villas, like Villa Hannala has survived.
