= Spa Hotel Eden =

Finnish hotel in Oulu

Break Sokos Hotel Eden
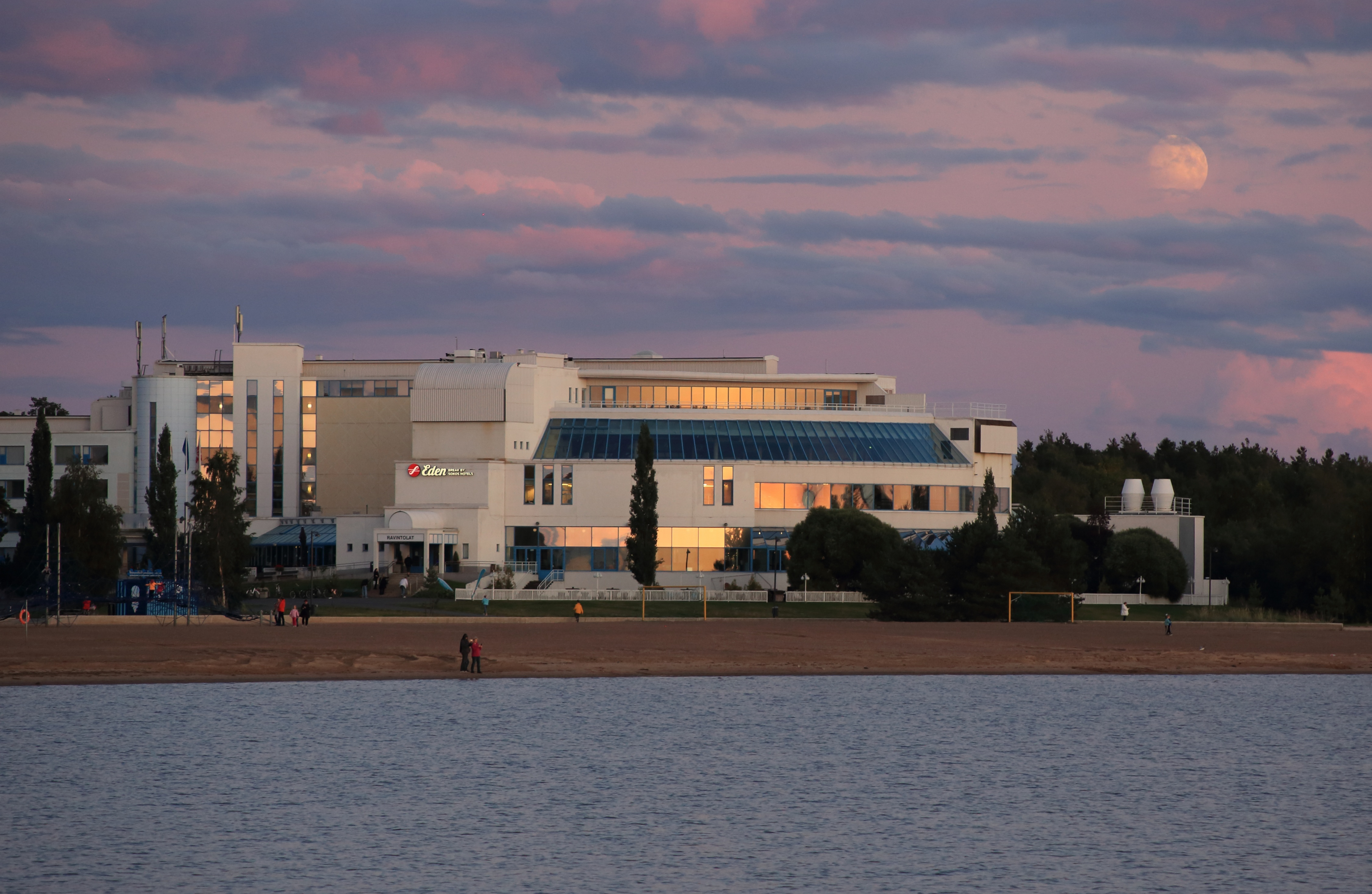
- Interactive map of the Break Sokos Hotel Eden area
- Hotel chain: Sokos Hotels

General information
- Location: Oulu, Finland, Holstinsalmentie 29, 90510 Oulu
- Coordinates: 65°01′41″N 025°24′50″E
- Opening: 18 August 1989
- Closed: December 2021
- Owner: S Group

Design and construction
- Architect: Paavo Karjalainen

Other information
- Number of rooms: 170
- Number of suites: 3
- Number of restaurants: 3

Website
- sokoshotels.fi

Break Sokos Hotel Eden was a spa hotel located in the Hietasaari district, 4.5 kilometres (2.8 mi) west of Oulu Centre in the Nallikari camping area. This Finland subtropical sea spa was constructed in 1989 by the designer Paavo Karjalainen.

The spa was originally known as The Eden Nallikari Sea Spa. Subsequent names have included Spa Hotel Eden, Oulu Eden Spa Hotel, Holiday Club Oulu Eden, and Sokos Hotel Eden. The hotel's last name was Break Sokos Hotel Eden.

== Services ==
Accommodations include 170 rooms, the majority with a view of the Baltic Sea. There are 100 standard rooms, 67 superior rooms and three suites.

== History ==
In 1988 construction began, lasting until the opening on 18 August 1989.

In 1993 Eden welcomed its millionth customer.

In 1998 a fire in the hotel's lobby bar destroyed the restaurant.

In 2002 a new wing containing 69 new rooms was added.

In 2006 Eden was bought by Sokotel from Holiday Club.

In December 2021 the spa ceased operations.
