= Villa Hannala =

Coordinates: 65°01′47″N 025°26′15″E

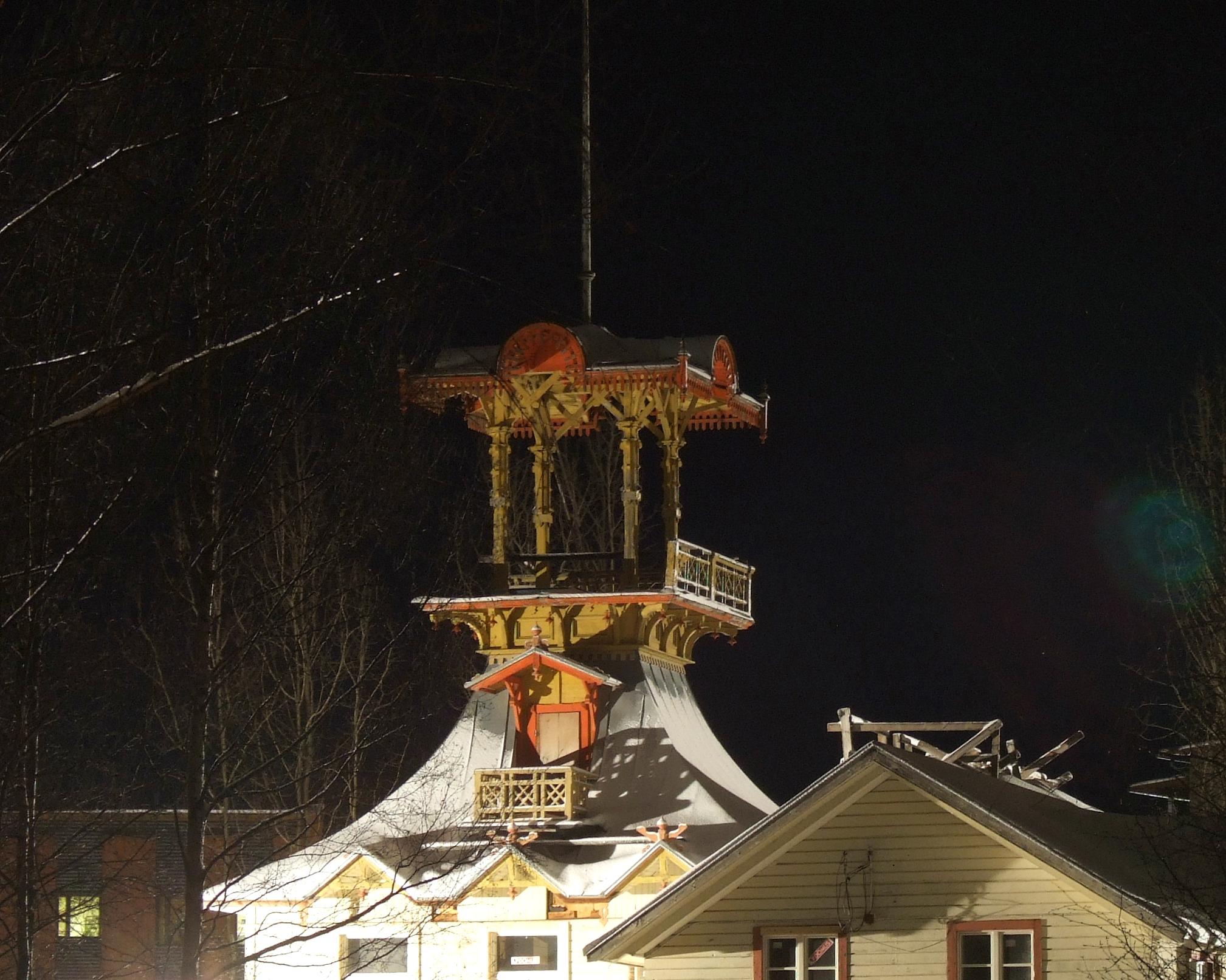
Villa Hannala at night

Villa Hannala is a historic villa in Toppilansaari, Oulu, Finland. Located at Kahvelitie 1, the villa was built in 1859 for the Snellman family. Decorations and a tower were added in the 1890s. After surviving the threat of demolition, the building became property of the city of Oulu. In 2004–2007 it was renovated by the adult educational centre of Oulu Polytechnic (Oulun Aikuiskoulutuskeskus). Today, the villa is almost fully restored. A café was established for visitors.
