= Hotel Torni =

Hotel in Helsinki, Finland

Sokos Hotel Torni
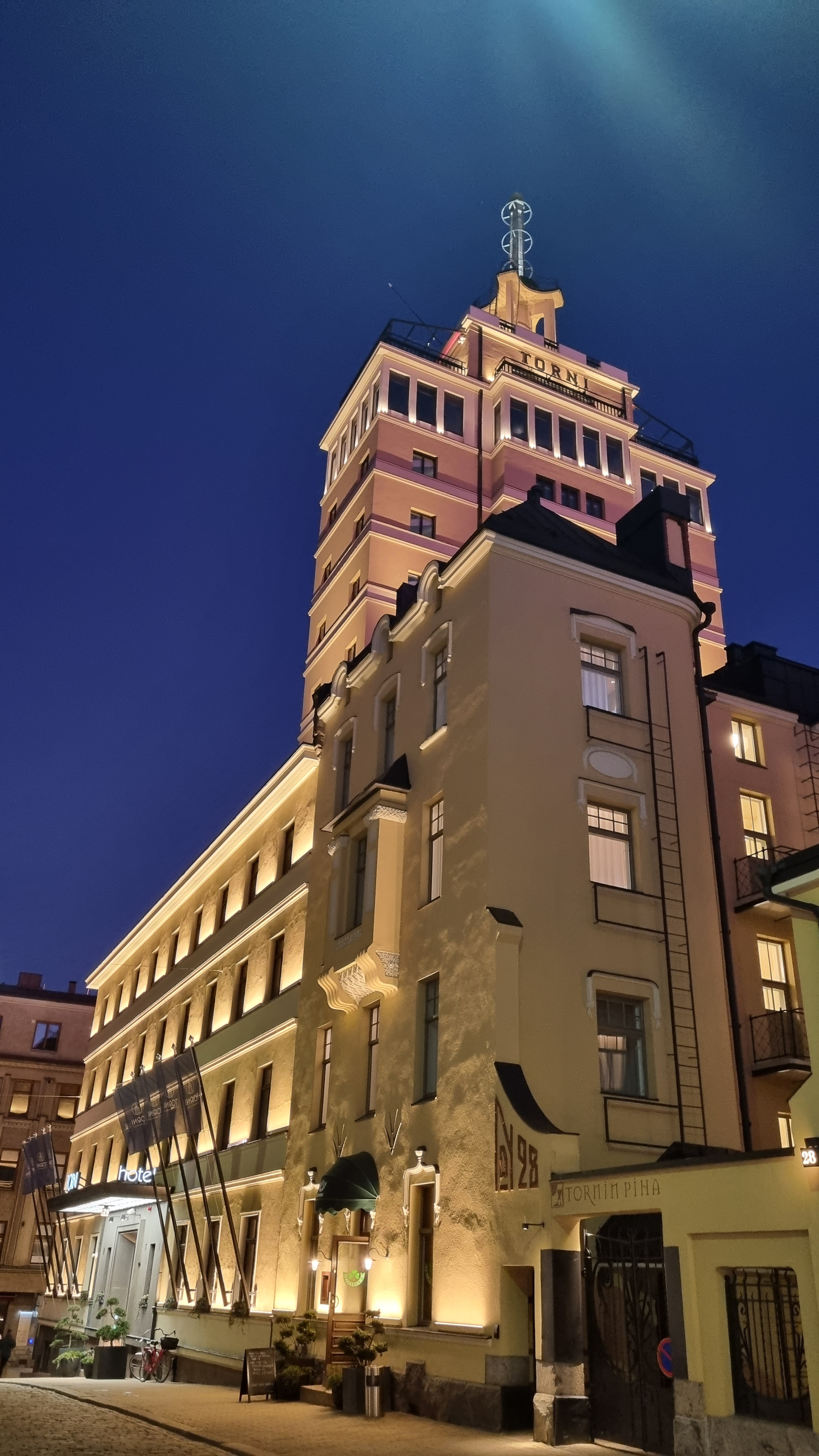
- Hotel Torni, seen from its northern side in 2023
- Interactive map of the Sokos Hotel Torni area
- Hotel chain: Sokos Hotels

General information
- Location: Kamppi, Helsinki, Finland, Yrjönkatu 26; FI-00100 Helsinki
- Coordinates: 60°10′04″N 24°56′18″E
- Opening: 1931

Height
- Height: 69.5 m (228 ft)

Technical details
- Floor count: 14

Design and construction
- Architects: Jung & Jung

Other information
- Number of rooms: 152
- Number of suites: 14
- Number of restaurants: 4

Website
- sokoshotels.fi

Hotel Torni (lit. 'Hotel Tower', officially Solo Sokos Hotel Torni) is a historical hotel located in Kamppi, Helsinki, Finland, and a part of the Sokos Hotels chain. When opened in 1931, it became the tallest building in Finland, a position it maintained until the completion of the new Neste headquarters in neighboring Espoo in 1976. It remained the tallest building in Helsinki until it was overtaken by Itäkeskuksen maamerkki in 1987. The interior of the building was completely renovated in 2005. It is located in central Helsinki, in the so-called Helsinki Design District.

== History ==
The hotel was designed by Finnish architects Bertel Jung & Valter Jung in 1928, and has 14 stories.

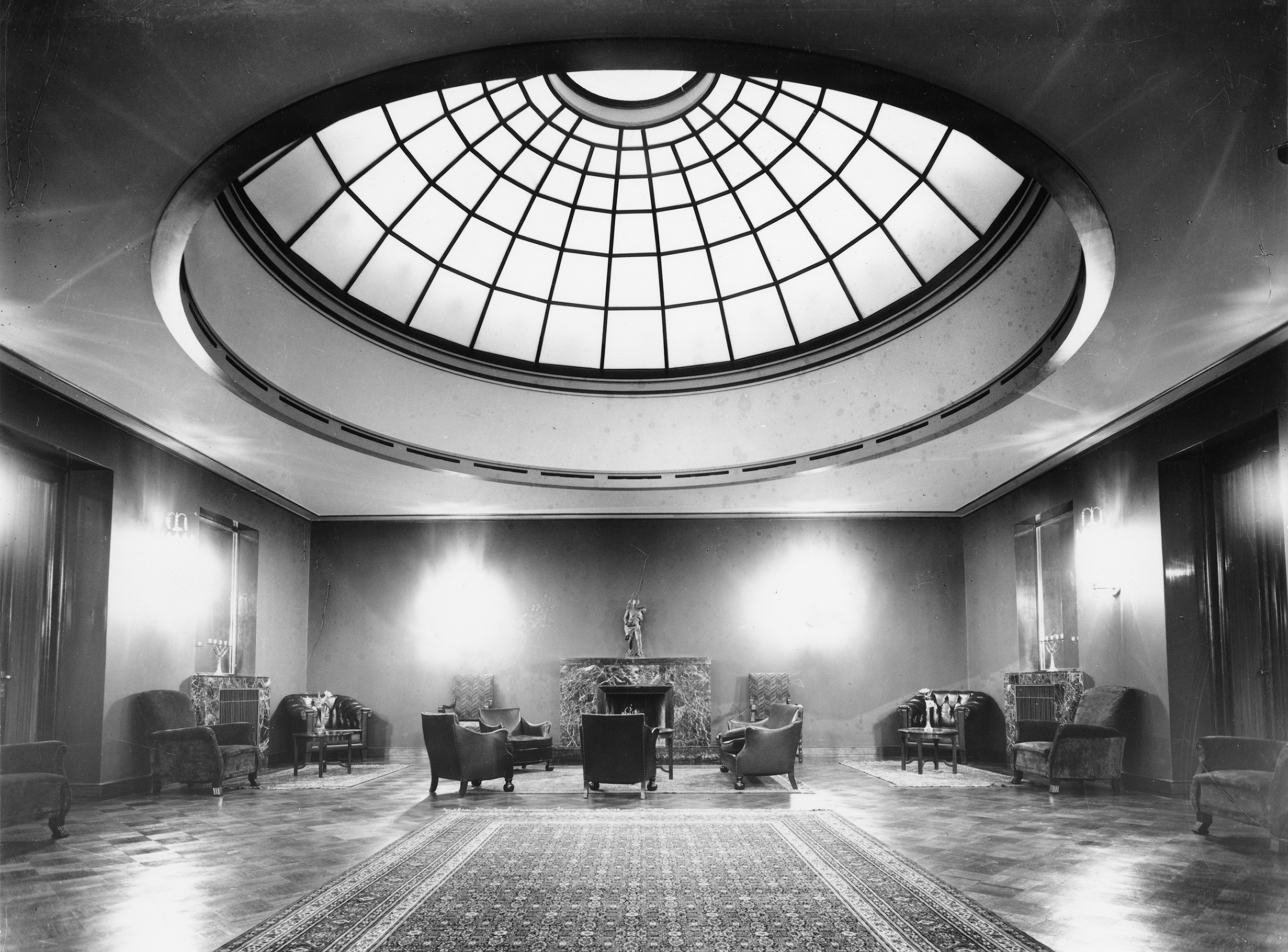
Hotel lobby in the 1930s

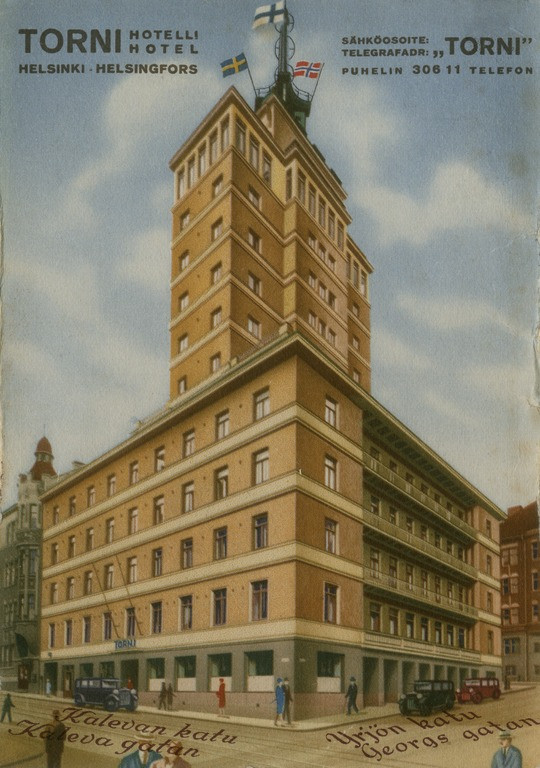
Advertisement from 1932

The spirit of modernity was also captured by the extraordinary scheme devised in 1930, when, during the hotel's construction, an access structure was erected on the roof. This was intended to allow docking for the airship Graf Zeppelin, which visited Helsinki on 24 September 1930. The idea was that the airship might alight upon the roof of Torni, whereupon its passengers could descend by ladder and proceed to the bar for a cocktail. The mooring was never realised, yet the passage built for this purpose remains visible in the ceiling of the Ateljee Bar, which now occupies the rooftop space.

It is allegedly the place where the murder of the Mata Hari-like Minna Craucher was planned in 1932.

During the Winter War, the hotel became the base of numerous foreign correspondents. The hotel served the needs of air defense during the Second World War, when members of the Finnish women's paramilitary organization Lotta Svärd used it as a watchtower to spot Soviet bombers. Immediately after the cessation of the war, Hotelli Torni served as the headquarters of the Allied Control Commission monitoring Finnish compliance with the obligations of the Moscow Armistice. It became known as a center of culinary excellence.

Among the personalities frequently seen there were the quizmaster Tauno Rautiainen.

Lee Harvey Oswald, the assassin of John F. Kennedy, stayed in the hotel from 10 to 11 October 1959, while on his way to defect to the USSR.

Actor Roger Moore stayed at the hotel during his visit to Finland in his capacity as a UNICEF Goodwill Ambassador in 1993.

== Restaurants ==
In Hotel Torni, there are several restaurants including Ravintola Torni (dining), Ateljee Bar (top of the tower with view over downtown Helsinki, known especially for the toilets which have scenic glass walls to the outside), American Bar (American style bar), and O'Malley's (Irish bar). The Ateljee Bar provides a monthly changing art exhibition featuring Finnish artists.

== See also ==
- Hotel Kämp
- Hotel Marski
- List of tallest buildings in Finland
- Palace Hotel
