= Nallikari =

Seaside resort in Oulu, Finland

- Beach
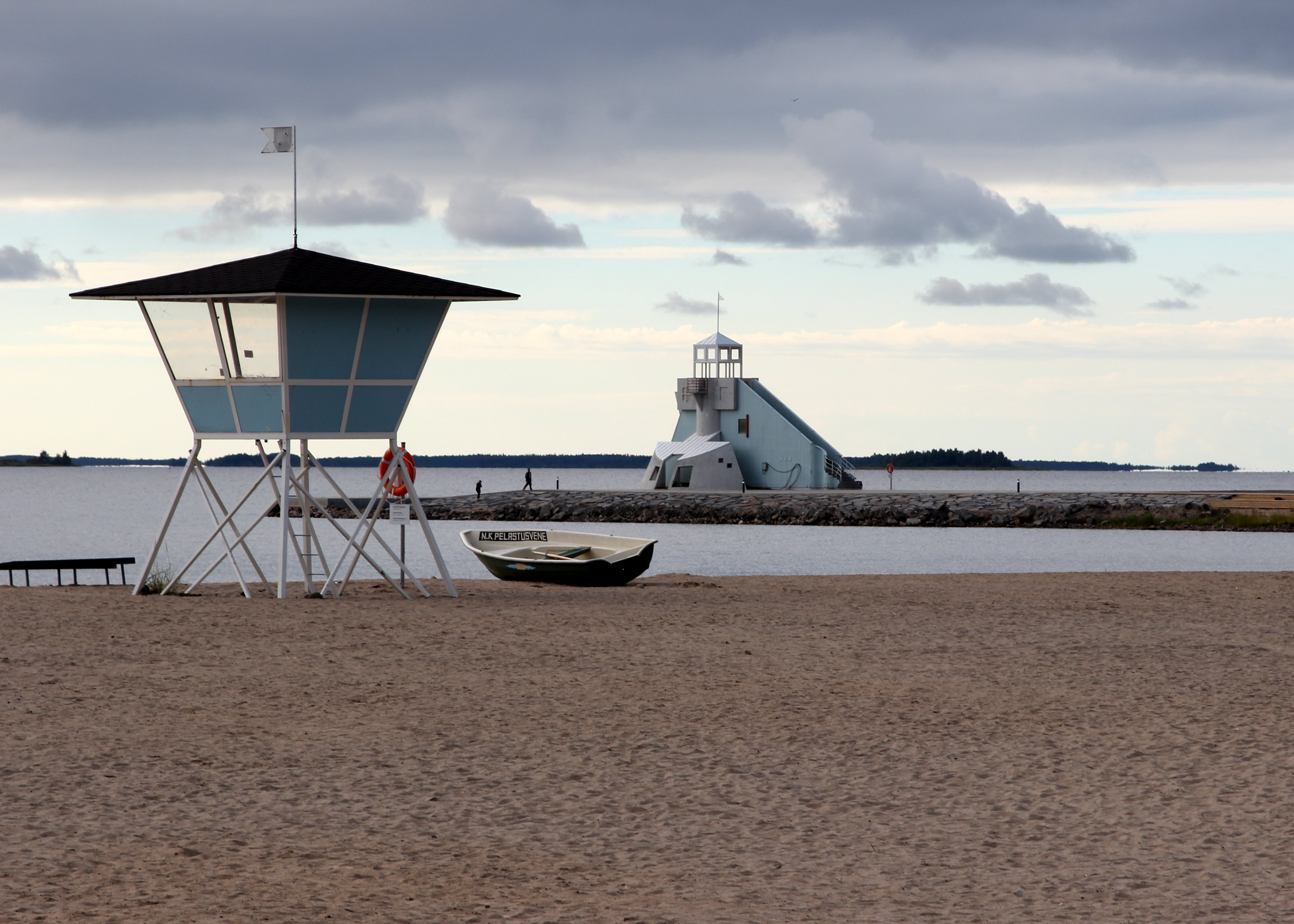
- Interactive map of Nallikari
- Coordinates: 65°01′48″N 025°24′38″E
- Location: Hietasaari, Oulu, Finland

Dimensions
  - Length: 500 m (1,600 ft)

Nallikari is a seaside resort located on an island in the Hietasaari district in Oulu, Finland. The resort can be reached year-round with the local bus routes 15 and 15N and during summertime with a trackless train called Potnapekka. The beach of Nallikari stretches for about half a kilometre.

In addition to the beach, Nallikari resort includes a spa hotel, a camping area with rentable cottages and a seaside restaurant. A public beach was established by the city of Oulu in Nallikari in 1946. The camping area was opened in the early 1960s. There were about 40,000 total nights stayed in the camping area in the summer 2014.
