= Hotel Ilves =

Hotel in Tampere, Finland

Sokos Hotel Ilves
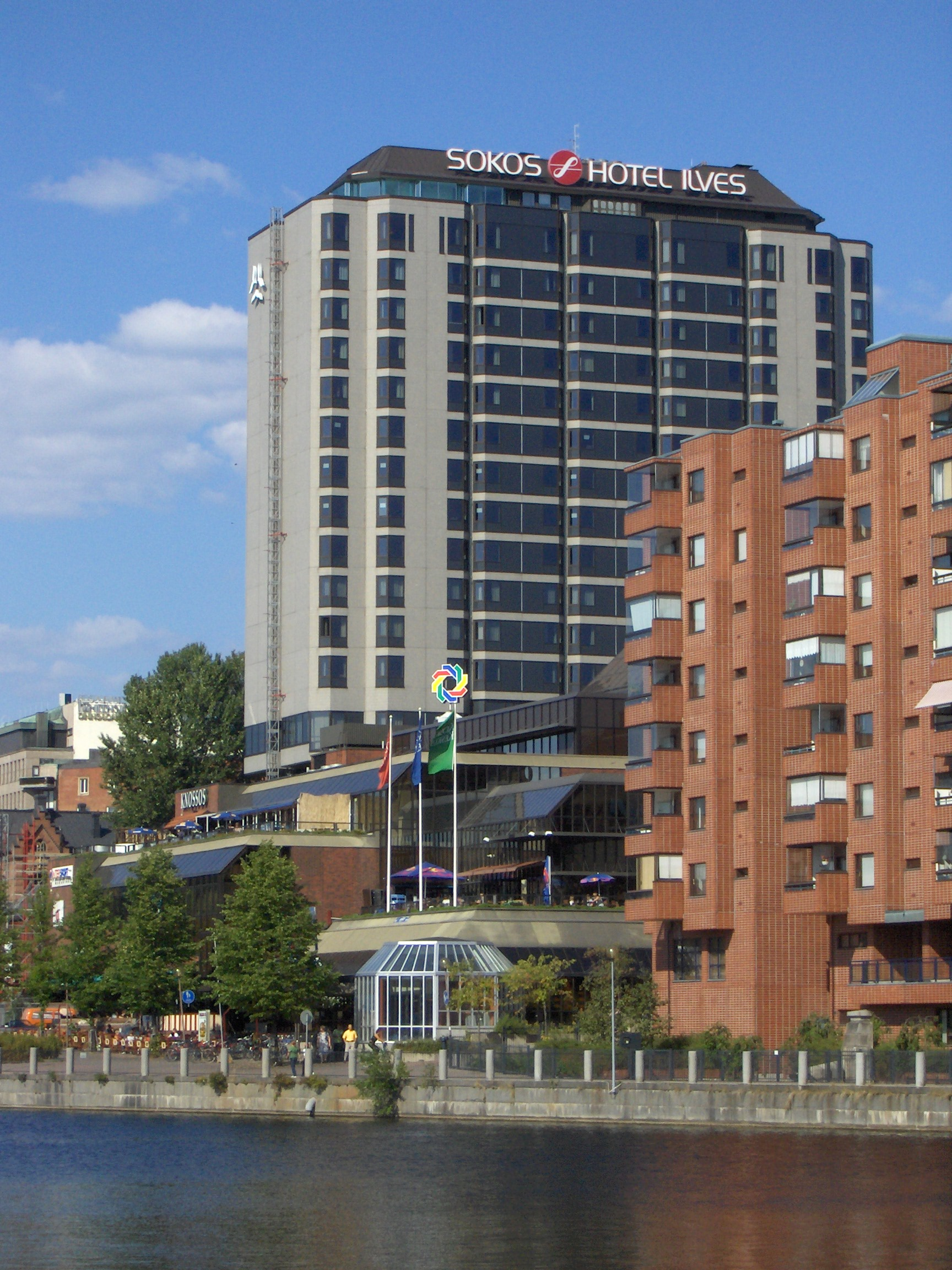
- Hotel Ilves

- Location within Finland
- Hotel chain: Sokos Hotels

General information
- Location: Tampere, Finland, Hatanpään valtatie 1, FI-33100 Tampere
- Coordinates: 61°29′46″N 023°46′00″E
- Opening: 1986

Height
- Height: 63 m (207 ft)

Design and construction
- Architect: Maunu Kitunen

Other information
- Number of rooms: 336
- Number of suites: 9
- Number of restaurants: 5

Website
- sokoshotels.fi

Hotel Ilves (officially Original Sokos Hotel Ilves) is an 18-storey hotel in the centre of Tampere, Finland. It was designed by architect Maunu Kitunen and was completed in 1986. The hotel has a total of 336 guest rooms and five restaurants. At 63 metres (207 ft) tall, the hotel is one of the tallest buildings in Finland outside Helsinki metropolitan area. Hotel Ilves is part of the S Group's Sokos Hotels chain.

== History ==
The S Group, a large Finnish co-operative company, first proposed the idea of building a new hotel in central Tampere in the 1970s. The site chosen was an old redbrick baize-factory situated near the Tammerkoski rapids. Two redbrick buildings and the base of an old factory chimney next to the hotel are the only surviving remnants of the large industrial premises.

In 1983 the S-group's design team travelled to the United States to see how some of the world's most famous hotels, such as the Grand Hyatt, Marriott and Hilton, were built. The project architect Maunu Kitunen completed the design in March 1983, creating a highly visible landmark in the centre of the city. The architect's idea for the shape of the building came from a matchbox.

The hotel was completed in 1986 and named Ilves (lynx) following a public competition.

== See also ==
- List of tallest buildings in Finland
