= Zeppelin (shopping centre) =

Zeppelin Shopping Center
- Kauppakeskus Zeppelin
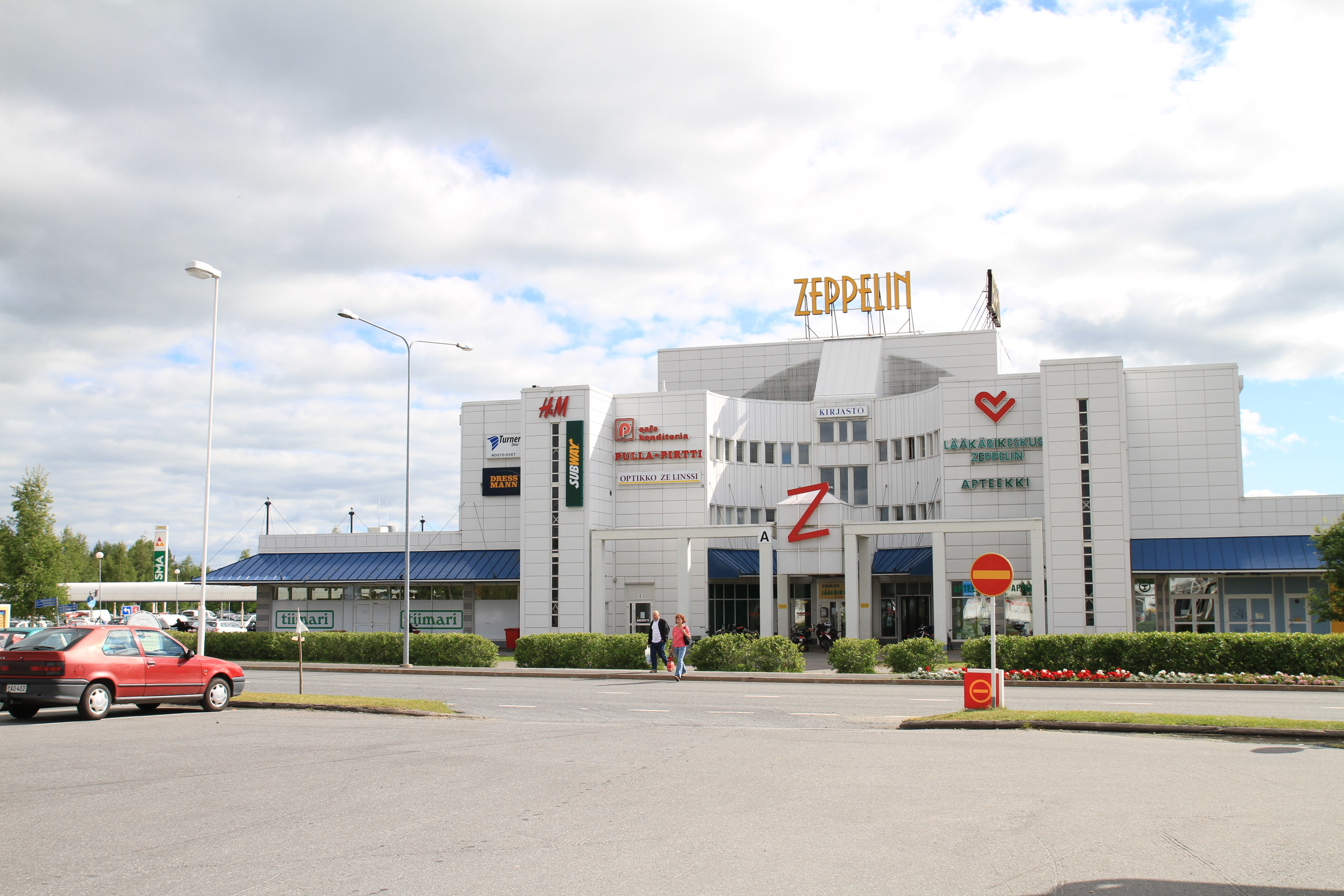
- Exterior of Zeppelin in June 2010
- Location: Ylikylä, Kempele, Finland
- Coordinates: 64°54′09″N 25°32′16″E
- Address: Zeppeliinintie 1
- Opened: April 8, 1992
- Owner: Sponda Oy
- Architect: Martti Väisänen Oy
- Num. of stores: 100
- Floors: 1
- Parking: 1,500
- Website: kauppakeskuszeppelin.fi

Zeppelin is a shopping center in Kempele, Finland. It is located in the immediate vicinity of Highway 4, about 12 kilometres (7.5 mi) south of the city center of Oulu and about 2 kilometres (1.2 mi) from Kempele's town center in the Ylikylä area, east of the Seinäjoki–Oulu railway known as the Ostrobothnian Railway.

The design of the shopping center began in 1986, conceived by Antero Immonen and Veikko Oikarinen, the then mayor of Kempele. In 1990, construction of the mall began and its inauguration was celebrated on April 8, 1992. In January–February 2011, expansion work was started in the shopping center, where the premises of the Prisma hypermarket were expanded and new retail premises were built. The extension was inaugurated on November 2, 2011.

== Services ==
A total of one hundred companies operate in the shopping center and its area. Companies that have been operating since the opening of the shopping center include the Pulla-Pirtti café-store, Kotipizza and the Arnolds bakery café, which is Finland's first Arnolds café opened by a franchisee.

Companies that later opened in Zeppelin include Clas Ohlson, Hesburger, H&M, Subway and Stadium. The Kempele Library also operates in connection with the shopping center. The mall previously housed St. Matthew's Chapel, which was demolished in the spring of 2017.

== See also ==
- Shopping centre Valkea
