= Port of Oulu =

Complex of three separate harbours in Oulu, Finland

Coordinates: 64°59′35″N 25°25′20″E

Port of Oulu (Oulun satama in Finnish) is a complex of three separate harbours located at the mouth of Oulujoki river in Oulu, Finland. Port of Oulu is a corporation owned by the City of Oulu. Annual average of 3 million tons of cargo is shipped on 500 vessels. Two of the ports, Nuottasaari and Oritkari, are also rail-served.

== Harbours in Port of Oulu ==
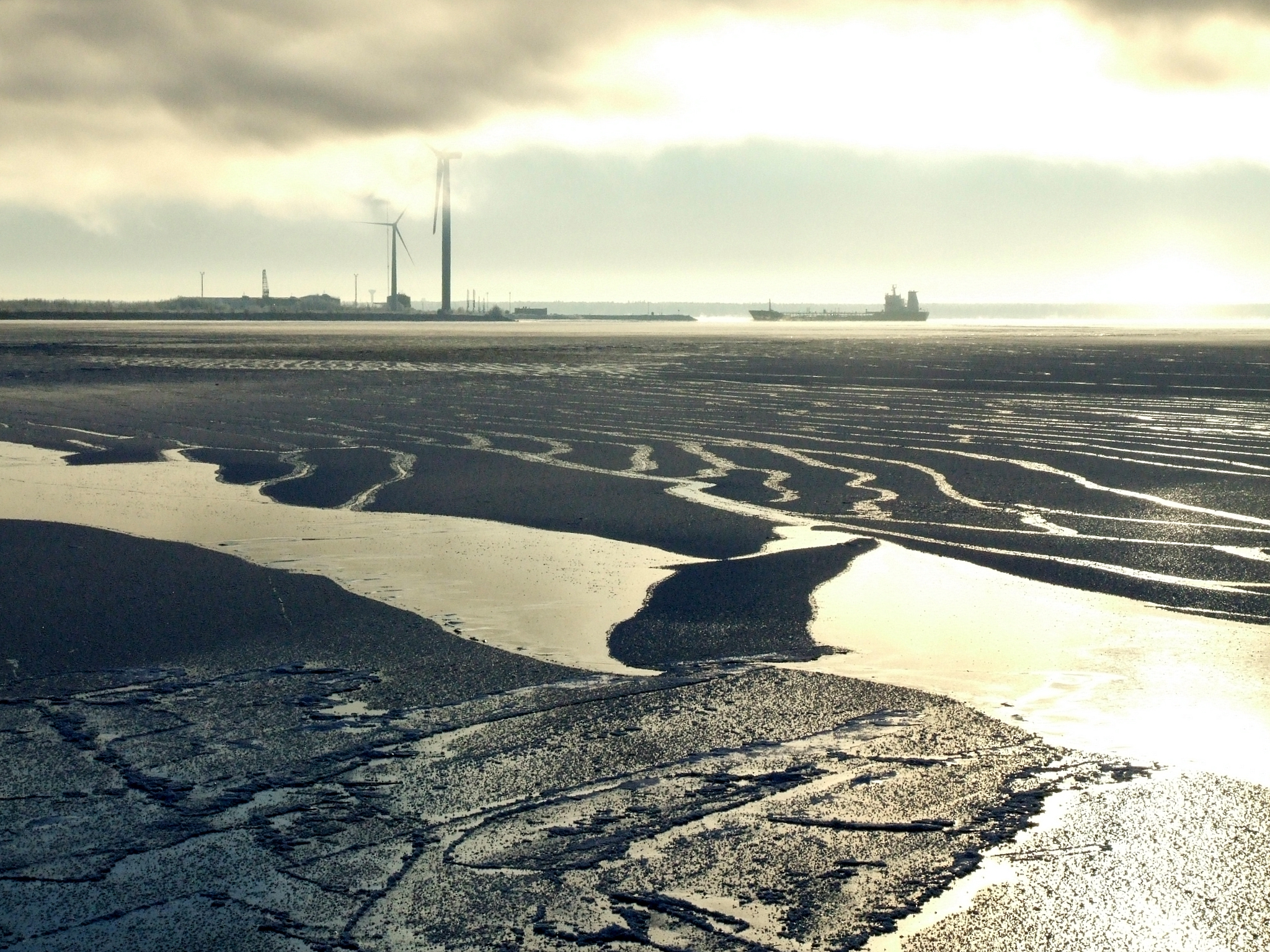
A cargo ship approaching the Vihreäsaari harbour

=== Vihreäsaari oil and bulk docks ===
Vihreäsaari oil docks on Vihreäsaari island, on the north bank of Oulujoki river is the most important oil dock in the city, with a maximum allowed draught of 10.0m. In addition to oil handling facilities there are six-ton bulk cranes in Vihreäsaari. The harbour was opened in 1963

=== Nuottasaari docks ===
Located next to the Stora Enso paper mill on the south bank of the river is the Nuottasaari docks with three separate piers: the main pier and two separate chemical piers. Maximum allowed draught in 6.4m. Two cranes of 8-ton and 6-ton capacities are in service. The harbour was opened in 1953

=== Oritkari docks ===
There are two 50-ton cranes at the Oritkari docks. Oritkari mainly handles container freight through its three piers. The harbour was opened in 1970.

== Historical harbours ==
=== Toppila docks ===
Toppila docks were located on both sides of the Toppilansalmi strait in the Toppilansaari and Toppila districts. Once a busy harbour, Toppila was closed from commercial traffic at the end of April 2012. Before the closure Toppila was a quiet harbour mainly used by bulk carriers. There were no fixed crane on the 450-metre pier and most of harbour activity had ceased already during the 1990s. Entire former harbour area has been zoned for apartment buildings.
