= Möljä Bridge =

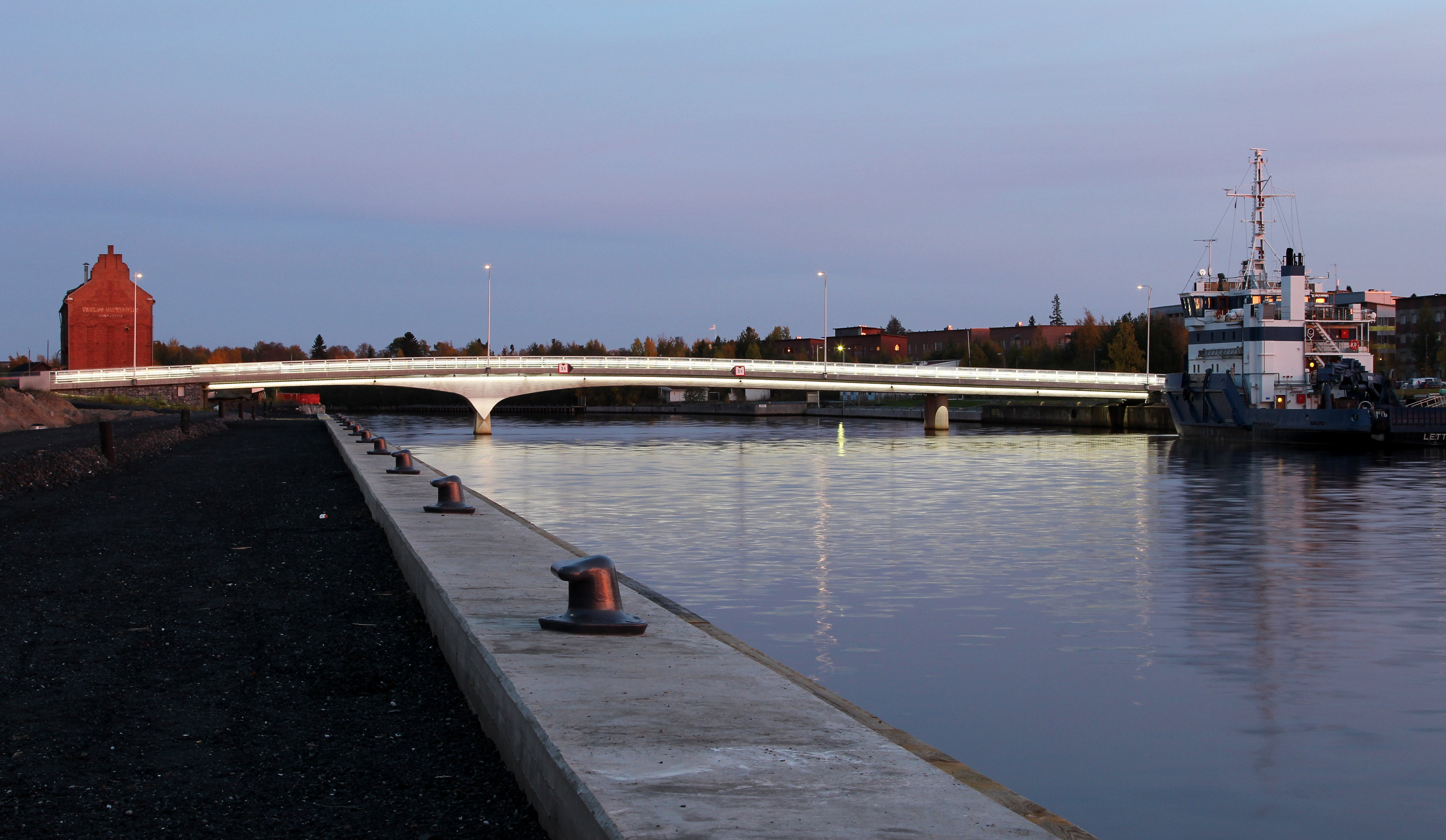
- Coordinates: 65°2′0″N 025°25′52″E
- Carries: 2 road lanes, raised sidewalks for pedestrian and bicycles
- Crosses: Toppilansalmi Strait
- Locale: Oulu, Finland
- Official name: Möljän silta
- Maintained by: City of Oulu

Characteristics
- Design: Concrete beam bridge
- Material: Concrete
- Total length: 98 m (322 ft)
- Width: 15 m (49 ft)
- Clearance below: 4 m (13 ft)

History
- Designer: Ilkka Kerola, Ramboll Finland Oy
- Construction start: October 2010
- Construction end: November 2012
- Construction cost: €2.6 million
- Opened: 15 November 2012

The Möljä Bridge (Finnish: Möljän silta) is a concrete beam bridge over the Toppilansalmi strait in Oulu, Finland. The bridge connects districts of Toppila and Toppilansaari. The bridge is 98 metres (322 ft) long, about 20 metres longer than the width of the Toppilansalmi strait at that point. Clearance beneath the bridge is 4 metres (13 ft).

The bridge has two road lanes and raised sidewalks for pedestrians and bicycles. It was opened to traffic on 15 November 2012.
