= Sokos =

Finnish department store chain

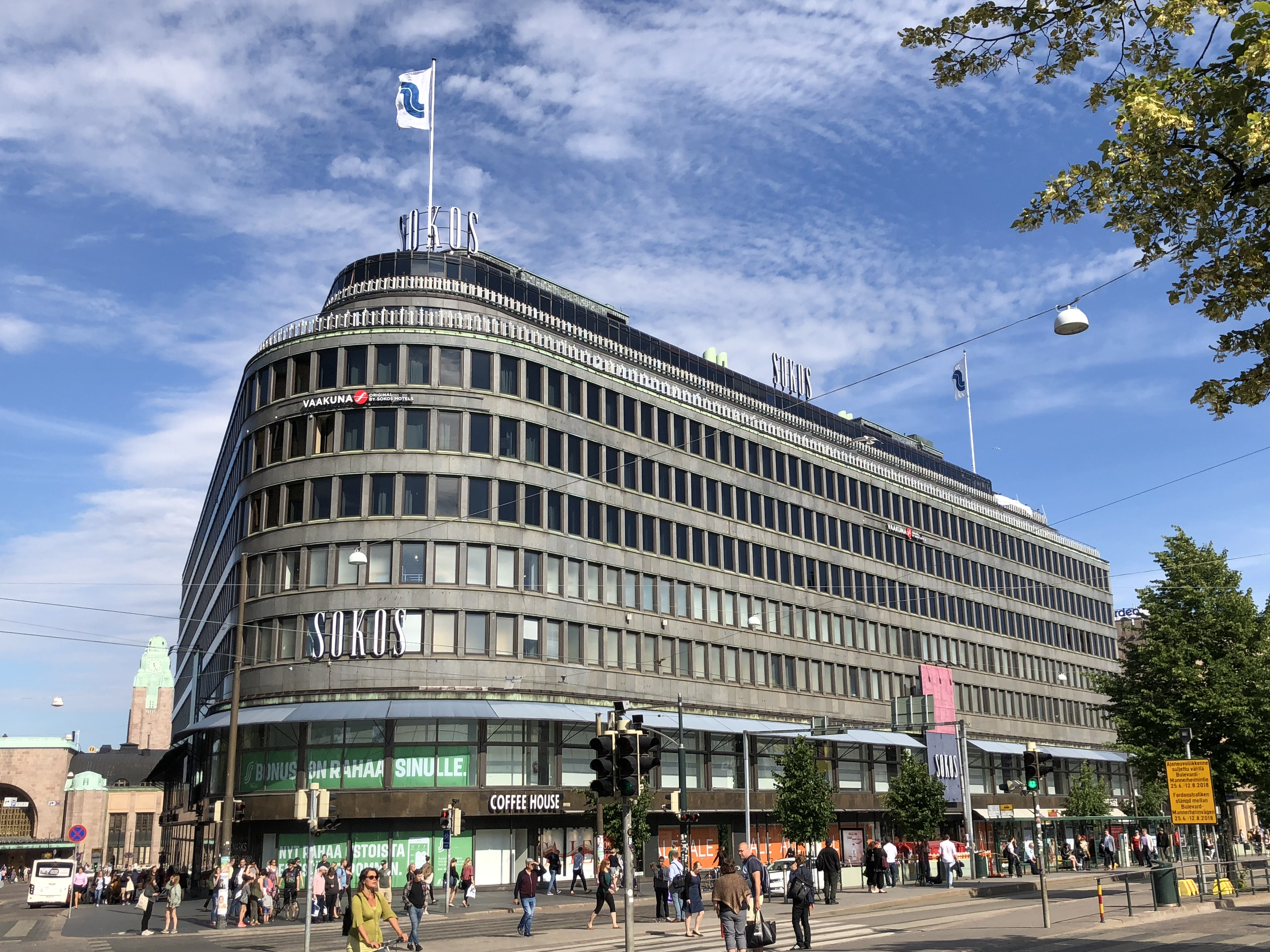
- Helsinki downtown Sokos department store and hotel
- Company type: Subsidiary
- Industry: Retail
- Headquarters: Finland
- Number of locations: 20
- Parent: S Group
- Website: sokos.fi

Sokos is a chain of department stores in Finland that is part of the S Group, which also operates the hotel chain, Sokos Hotels.

== Department stores ==
- Helsinki (centre)
- Helsinki (Kaari)
- Hämeenlinna
- Joensuu
- Jyväskylä
- Kajaani
- Kotka
- Kouvola
- Kuopio
- Lahti
- Lohja
- Mikkeli
- Oulu (Shopping centre Valkea)
- Pori
- Porvoo
- Raisio (Mylly (Engl: "Mill") shopping center)
- Salo
- Savonlinna
- Tampere
- Turku (Wiklund)
