= Sokos Hotels =

Finnish hotel chain

- Type: Subsidiary
- Industry: Hospitality
- Founded: 1974; 52 years ago
- Headquarters: Finland
- Number of locations: 48 hotels
- Areas served: Finland; Tallinn (Estonia)
- Services: Hotels
- Parent: S Group
- Website: sokoshotels.fi

Sokos Hotels is a Finnish hotel chain. It is the largest hotel chain in Finland, with a total of 48 hotels in 30 different cities and municipalities. Forty-seven hotels are located in Finland and one in Tallinn, Estonia.

Sokos Hotels is a part of S Group, which also operates the Sokos department store chain. Its S-Etukortti can be used at Sokos Hotels for customer ownership benefits. There is also S-Card, which can also be used at Sokos Hotels and other hotels and restaurants owned by S Group for benefits.

== History ==
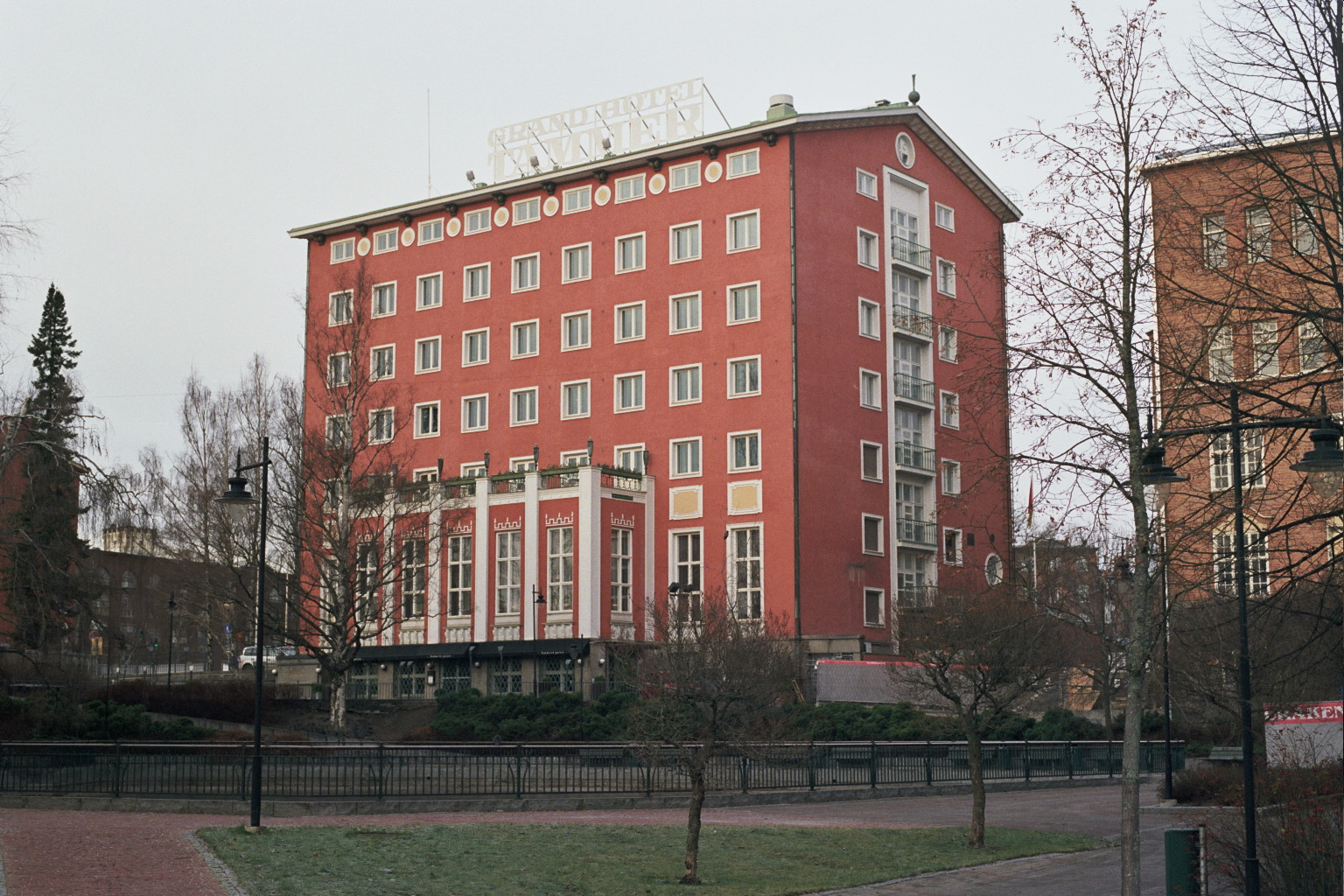
Grand Hotel Tammer, Tampere, a former hotel belonging to the Sokos Hotels chain, which has been a part of the Radisson Blu hotel chain since 2016.

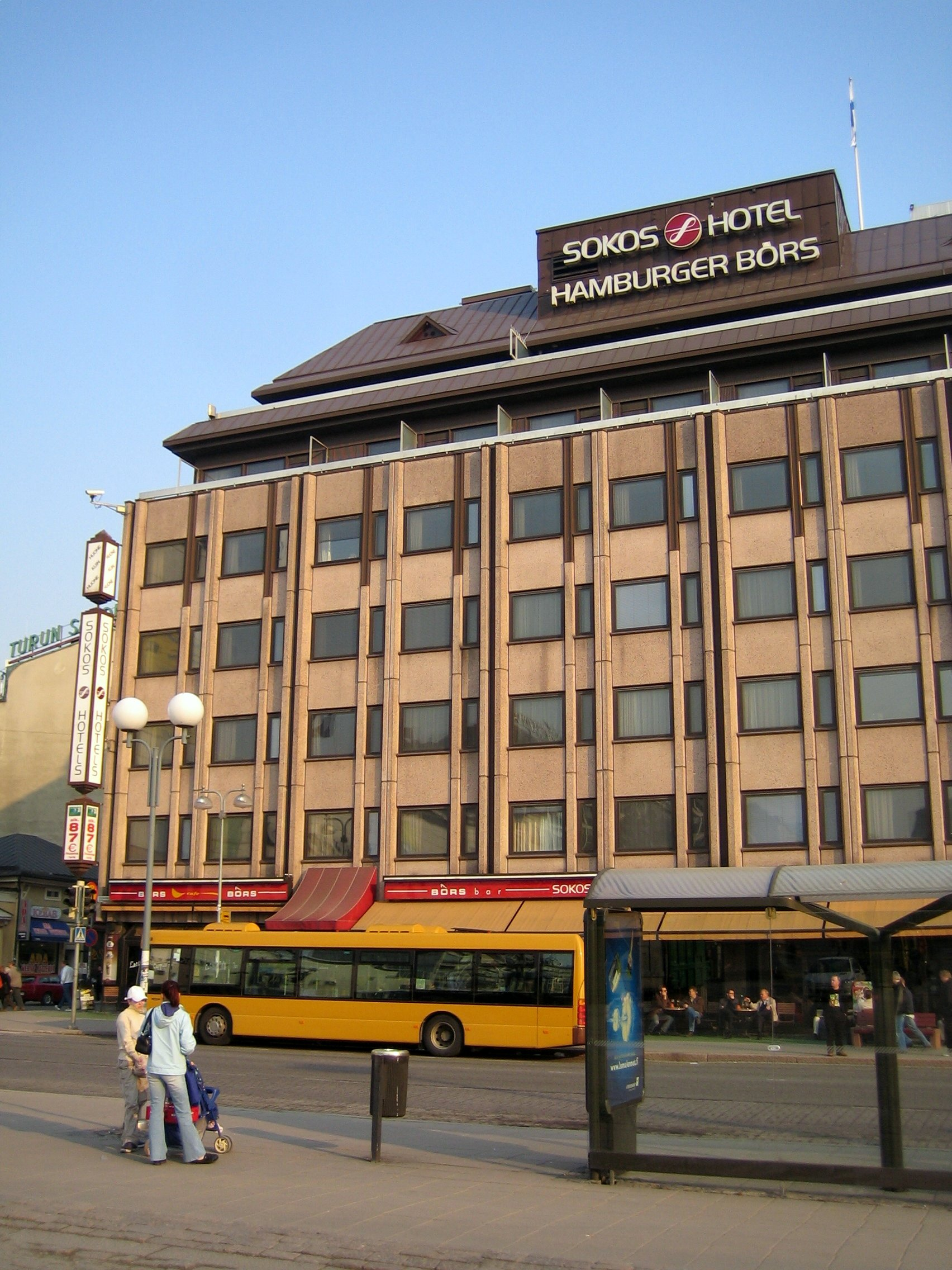
Hotel Hamburger Börs, Turku, a former hotel belonging to the Sokos Hotels chain, which ceased operations on 26 May 2019. A new Scandic hotel is being built by YIT in its location, which will be finished by autumn of 2021.

Sokos Hotels was established in 1974 after grouping all of SOK's 1- to 5 -star hotels and motels into one hotel chain. Grand Hotel Tammer, Hotel Hamburger Börs, as well as Hotels Vaakuna, Torni, and Helsinki joined the hotel chain in the 1970s. Due to the 1973 oil crisis, hotel pools were not heated, and electricity was cut at night. According to Sokos Hotels, many hotels during this period were not yet equipped with in-room toilets and shower facilities. These hotels underwent major hotel renovations.

In the 1980s, S Group's French restaurant chain, Fransmanni, was established and introduced in Sokos Hotels. The first restaurant was opened in 1989 in Sokos Hotel Raumalinna in Rauma. S Group's Italian restaurant chain, Rosso, was already introduced in 1978. From 2016 to 2017, Fransmanni restaurants were converted into Frans & les Femmes bistros. Waterbeds, hot tubs, and minibars were also introduced in the 1980s. Exercise bikes and tanning devices were available for lending.

Due to the early 1990s recession, Finland underwent a financial depression. Hotels faced declining sales and worker amounts were reduced. In the mid-1990s, Sokos Hotels began cooperating with various amusement parks, ski resorts, and other leisure companies. New service packages were introduced: Lähde shopping packages, Avec pampering packages, Fun party packages, and Kids family packages.

In the 2000s, Sokos Hotels expanded to Russia and Estonia. Three new hotels were opened in Saint Petersburg. Hotel Palace Bridge and Hotel Vasilievsky were opened in Vasilyevsky Island in Saint Petersburg in 2008 and 2009 respectively. Hotel Olympic Garden was opened on the Moskovsky Prospekt in 2008. Additionally, Hotel Viru in Tallinn was added to the chain in 2007. Also during the 2000s, Sokos Hotels opened hotels that operate with leisure centers: Hotel Tahko, Hotel Koli, Hotel Vuokatti, and Hotel Flamingo. Hotel Levi in Kittilä was opened in 2008 and became Sokos Hotels' northern-most hotel. The chain purchases six spa hotels from Holiday Club.

From 2012 to 2013, Sokos Hotels underwent a brand reform, and its hotels were divided into three newly introduced hotel types: Break, Original, and Solo. In 2014, Sokos Hotel Torni Tampere in Tampere was opened and became Finland's second-tallest building. Sokos Hotels' newest hotels include Sokos Hotel Tripla in Helsinki and Sokos Hotel Kupittaa in Turku, both of which were opened in 2020.

In early 2022, S Group ceased all activities in Russia due to Russian invasion of Ukraine.

== List of hotels ==
The Sokos Hotels chain consists of three hotel types: Break, Original, and Solo. Most of the hotels belong to the Original category. They are usually situated in city centers and include traditional hotel services. Hotels that belong to the Break category operate in connection with spas, ski resorts, and nature resorts. Hotels in the Solo category are more personalized and offer a higher level of service, according to Sokos Hotels.

List of Sokos Hotels
City	Type	Name	Address	Notes
Espoo	Original	Sokos Hotel Tapiola Garden	Tapionaukio 3, 02100 Espoo	
Helsinki	Original	Sokos Hotel Albert	Albertinkatu 30, 00120 Helsinki	
Helsinki	Original	Sokos Hotel Helsinki	Kluuvikatu 8, 00100 Helsinki	
Helsinki	Original	Sokos Hotel Presidentti	Eteläinen Rautatiekatu 4, 00100 Helsinki	
Helsinki	Original	Sokos Hotel Tripla	Fredikanterassi 1 B, 00520 Helsinki	
Helsinki	Original	Sokos Hotel Vaakuna	Asema-Aukio 2, 00100 Helsinki	
Helsinki	Solo	Sokos Hotel Torni	Yrjönkatu 26, 00100 Helsinki	
Hämeenlinna	Original	Sokos Hotel Vaakuna	Possentie 7, 13200 Hämeenlinna	
Iisalmi	Original	Sokos Hotel Koljonvirta	Savonkatu 18, 74100 Iisalmi	
Joensuu	Original	Sokos Hotel Kimmel	Itäranta 1, 80100 Joensuu	
Joensuu	Original	Sokos Hotel Vaakuna	Torikatu 20, 80100 Joensuu	
Jyväskylä	Original	Sokos Hotel Alexandra	Hannikaisenkatu 35, 40100 Jyväskylä	
Jyväskylä	Solo	Sokos Hotel Paviljonki	Lutakonaukio 10, 40100 Jyväskylä	
Kajaani	Original	Sokos Hotel Valjus	Kauppakatu 20, 87100 Kajaani	
Kittilä	Break	Sokos Hotel Levi	Tähtitie 5, 99130 Sirkka	(Note: Operates in Levi ski resort)
Kokkola	Original	Sokos Hotel Kaarle	Kauppatori 4, 67100 Kokkola	
Kotka	Original	Sokos Hotel Seurahuone	Keskuskatu 21, 48100 Kotka	
Kouvola	Original	Sokos Hotel Vaakuna	Hovioikeudenkatu 2, 45100 Kouvola	
Kuopio	Break	Sokos Hotel Tahko	Sääskiniementie 560, 73310 Tahkovuori	(Note: Operates in Tahkovuori resort)
Kuopio	Original	Sokos Hotel Puijonsarvi	Minna Canthin Katu 16, 70100 Kuopio	
Lahti	Solo	Sokos Hotel Lahden Seurahuone	Aleksanterinkatu 14, 15110 Lahti	
Lappeenranta	Original	Sokos Hotel Lappee	Brahenkatu 1, 53100 Lappeenranta	
Lieksa	Break	Sokos Hotel Koli	Ylä-Kolintie 39, 83960 Koli	(Note: Operates in Koli National Park)
Mikkeli	Original	Sokos Hotel Vaakuna	Porrassalmenkatu 9, 50100 Mikkeli	
Nurmes	Break	Sokos Hotel Bomba	Tuulentie 10, 75500 Nurmes	(Note: Operates as spa hotel)
Oulu	Break	Sokos Hotel Eden	Holstinsalmentie 29, 90510 Oulu	(Note: Operates as spa hotel)
Oulu	Original	Sokos Hotel Arina	Pakkahuoneenkatu 16, 90100 Oulu	
Pori	Original	Sokos Hotel Vaakuna	Gallen-Kallelankatu 7, 28100 Pori	
Rovaniemi	Original	Sokos Hotel Vaakuna	Koskikatu 4, 96200 Rovaniemi	
Salo	Original	Sokos Hotel Rikala	Asemakatu 15, 24100 Salo	
Savonlinna		Summer Hotel Tott	Satamakatu 1, 57130 Savonlinna	(Note: Operates as independent seasonal hotel)
Savonlinna	Original	Sokos Hotel Seurahuone	Kauppatori 4–6, 57130 Savonlinna	
Seinäjoki	Original	Sokos Hotel Lakeus	Torikatu 2, 60100 Seinäjoki	
Seinäjoki	Original	Sokos Hotel Vaakuna	Kauppatori 3, 60100 Seinäjoki	
Sotkamo	Break	Sokos Hotel Vuokatti	Kidekuja 2, 88610 Vuokatti	(Note: Operates in Vuokatti ski resort and travel centre)
Tallinn (Estonia)	Original	Sokos Hotel Viru	Viru Väljak 4, EE-10111 Tallinn	
Tampere	Original	Sokos Hotel Ilves	Hatanpään Valtatie 1, 33100 Tampere	
Tampere	Original	Sokos Hotel Villa	Sumeliuksenkatu 14, 33100 Tampere	
Tampere	Solo	Sokos Hotel Torni Tampere	Ratapihankatu 43, 33100 Tampere	
Turku	Original	Sokos Hotel Kupittaa	Joukahaisenkatu 6, 20520 Turku	
Turku	Original	Sokos Hotel Wiklund	Eerikinkatu 11, 20100 Turku	
Turku	Solo	Sokos Hotel Turun Seurahuone	Humalistonkatu 2, 20100 Turku	
Vaasa	Original	Sokos Hotel Royal Vaasa	Hovioikeudenpuistikko 18, 65100 Vaasa	
Vaasa	Original	Sokos Hotel Vaakuna	Rewell Center 101, 65100 Vaasa	
Vantaa	Break	Sokos Hotel Flamingo	Tasetie 8, 01510 Vantaa	(Note: Operates as spa and airport hotel in Flamingo entertainment centre)
Vantaa	Original	Sokos Hotel Vantaa	Hertaksentie 2, 01300 Vantaa	

Sokos Hotels Gallery
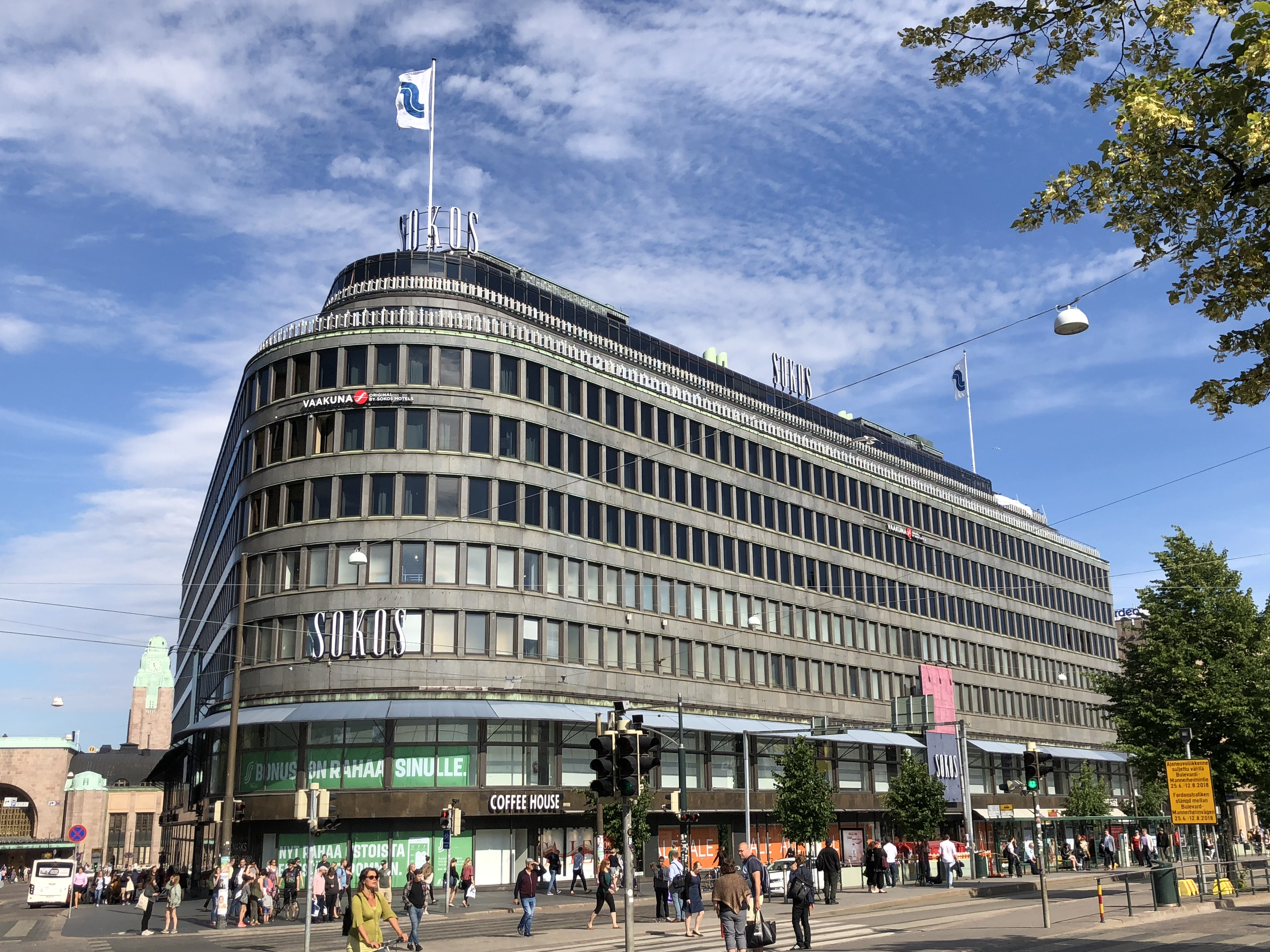
Sokos Hotel Vaakuna, Helsinki

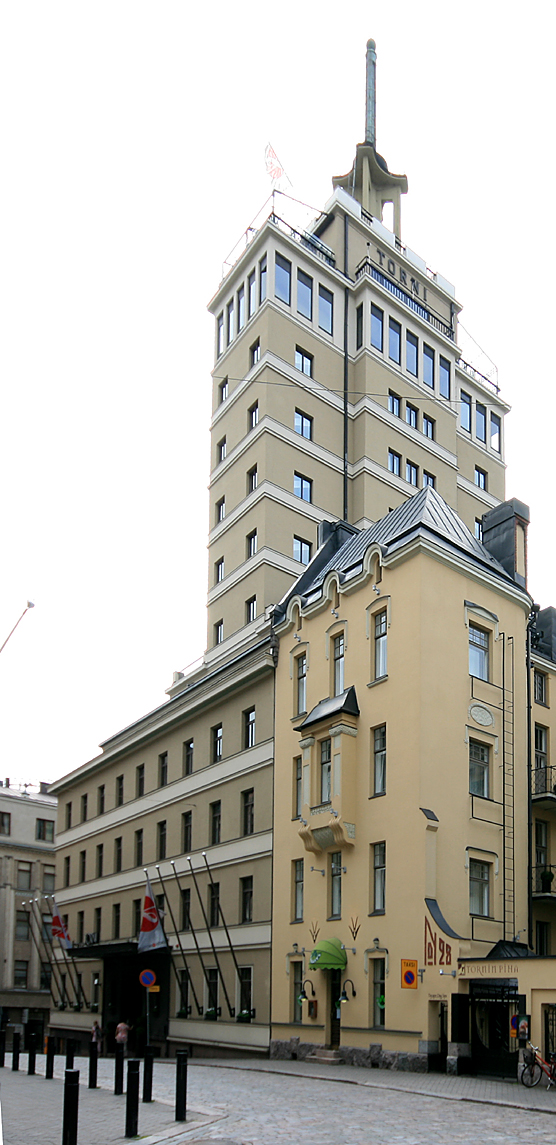
Sokos Hotel Torni, Helsinki

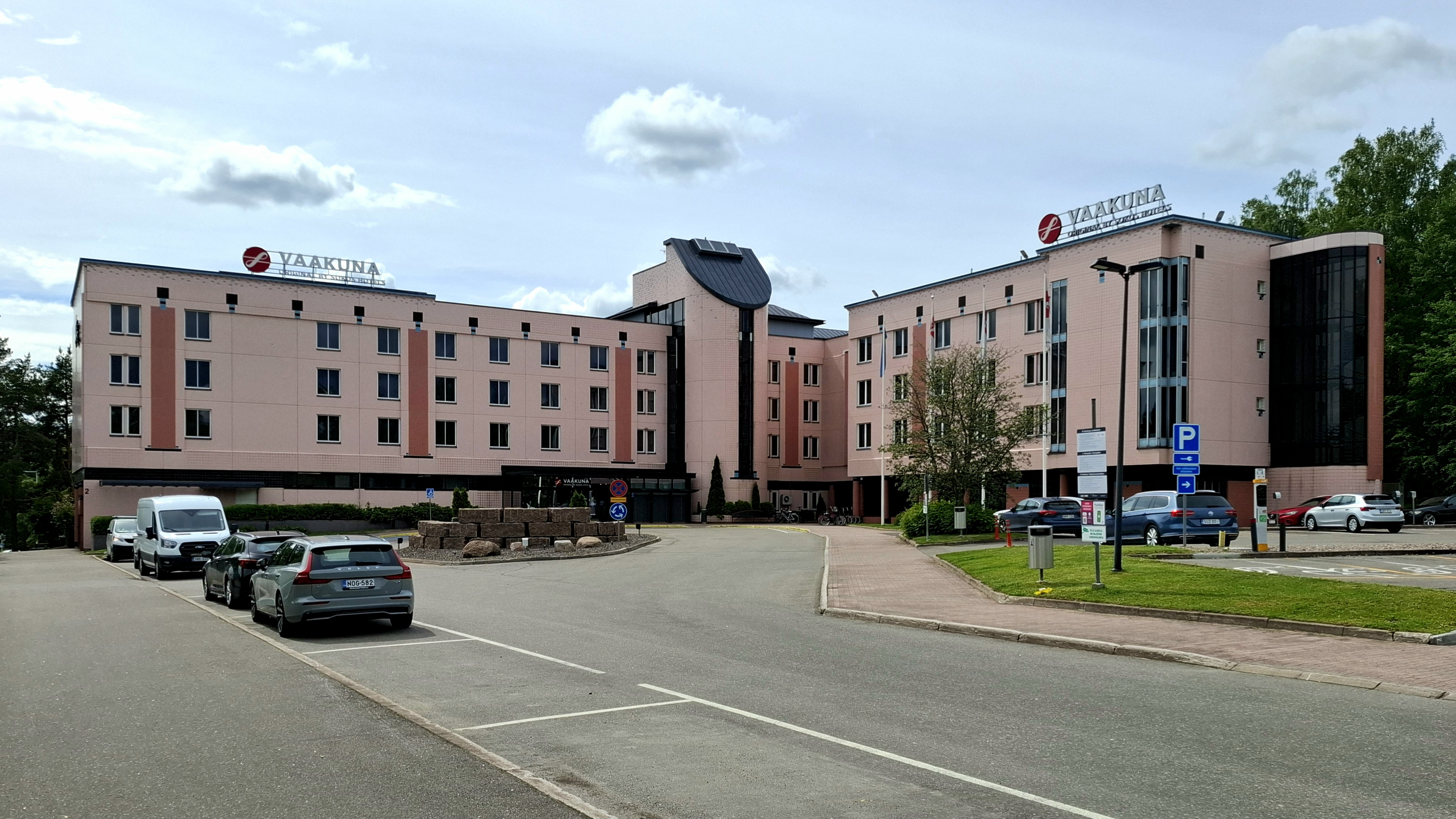
Sokos Hotel Vaakuna, Kouvola

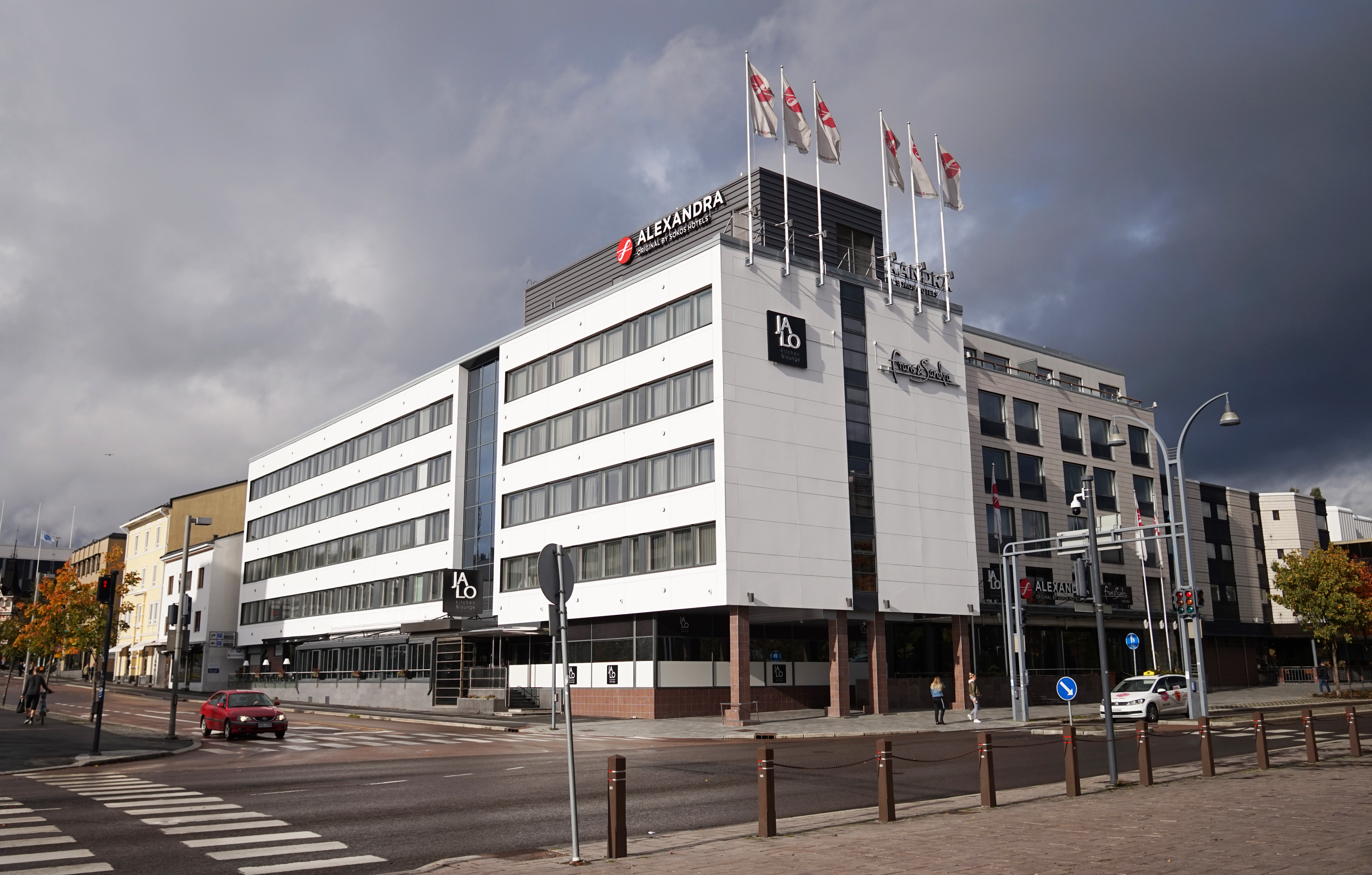
Sokos Hotel Alexandra, Jyväskylä

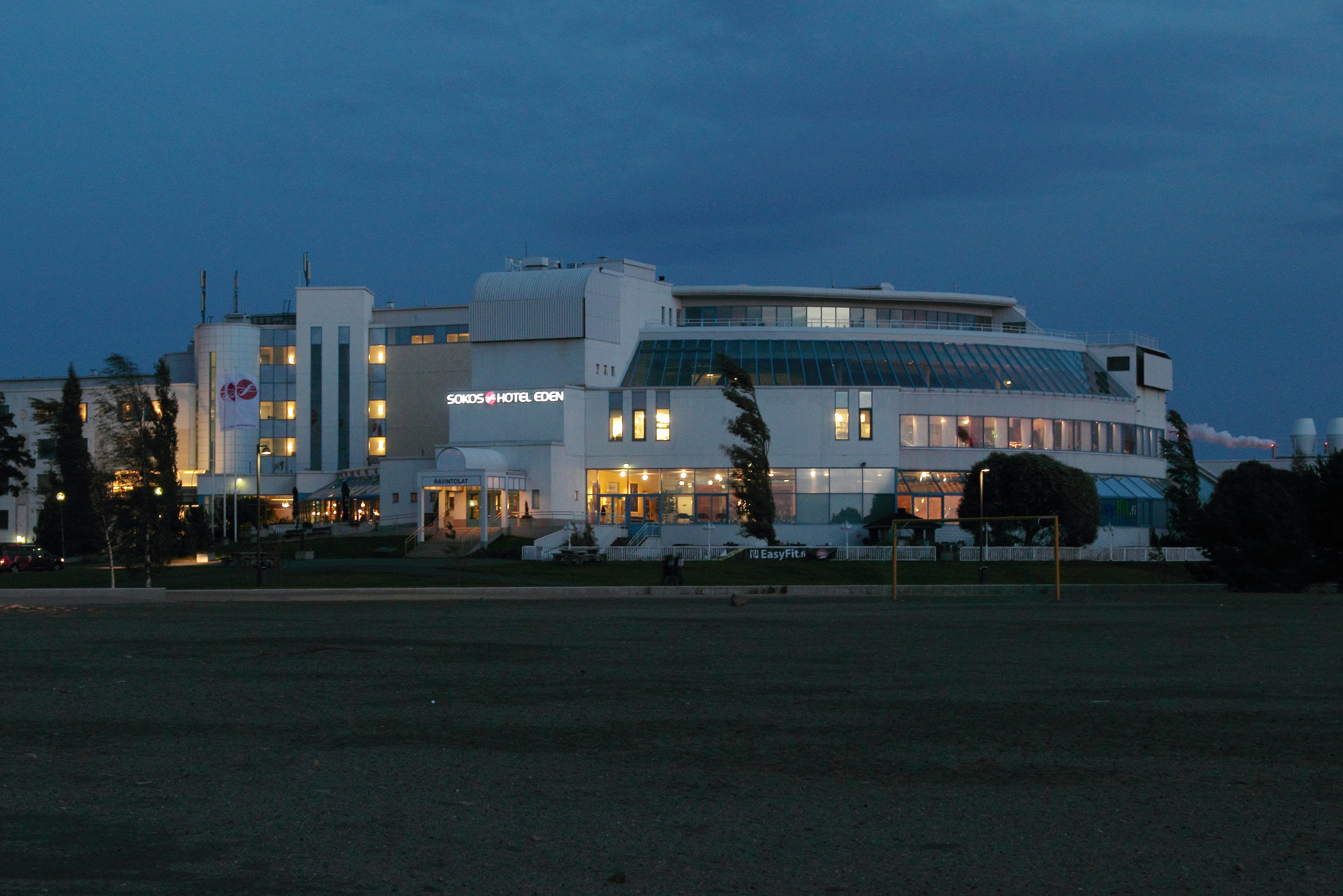
Sokos Hotel Eden, Oulu

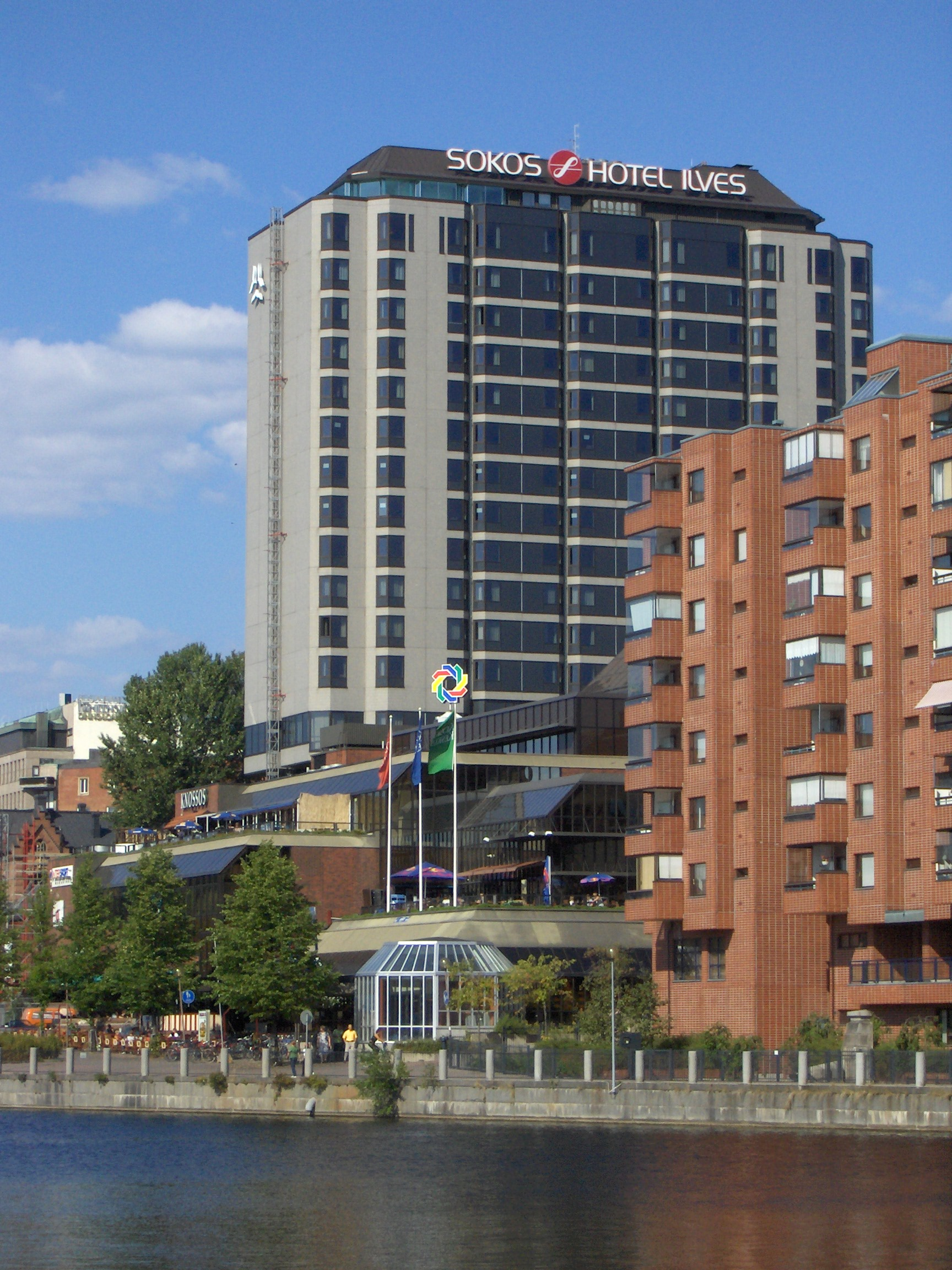
Sokos Hotel Ilves, Tampere

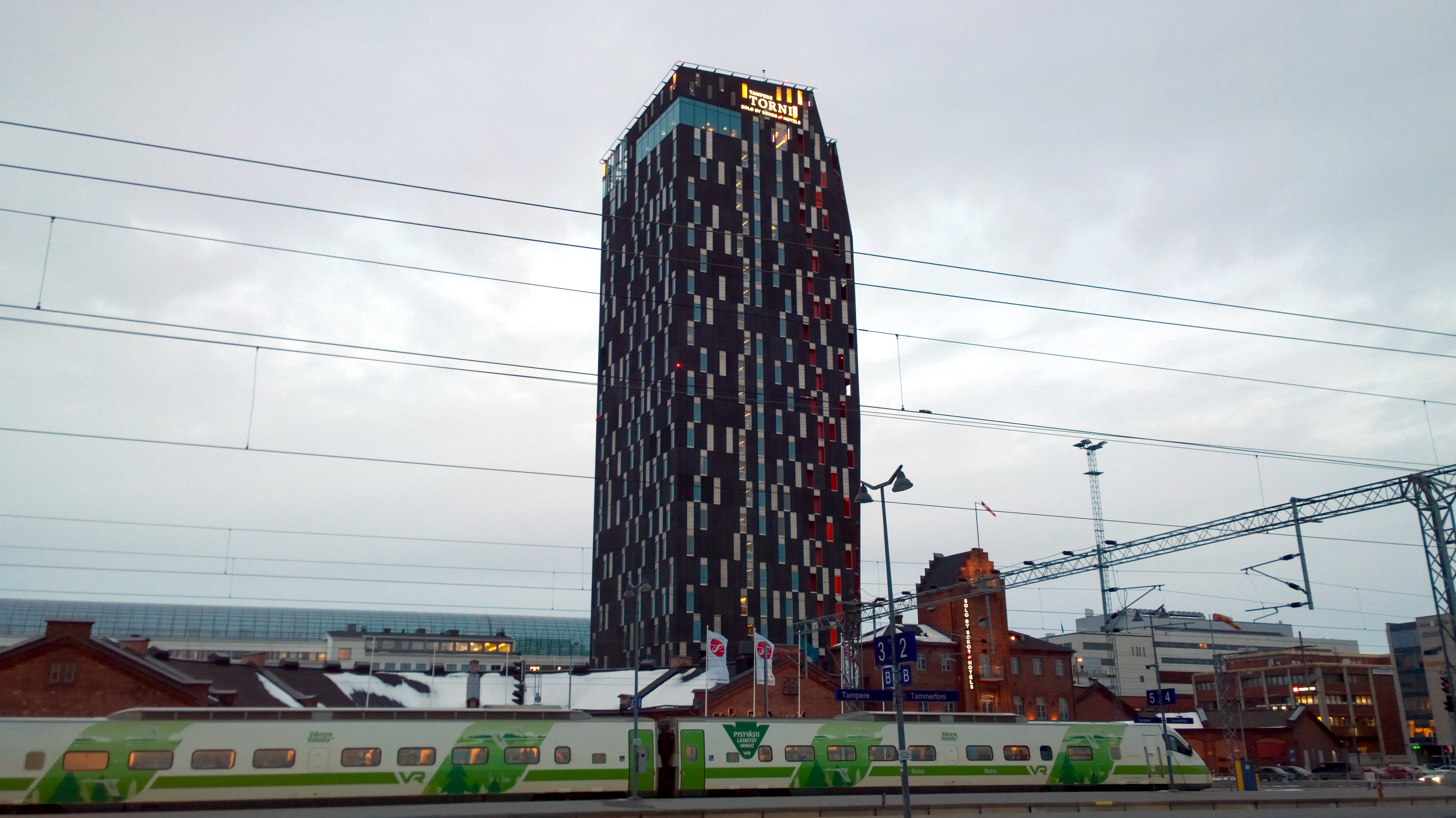
Sokos Hotel Torni Tampere, Tampere

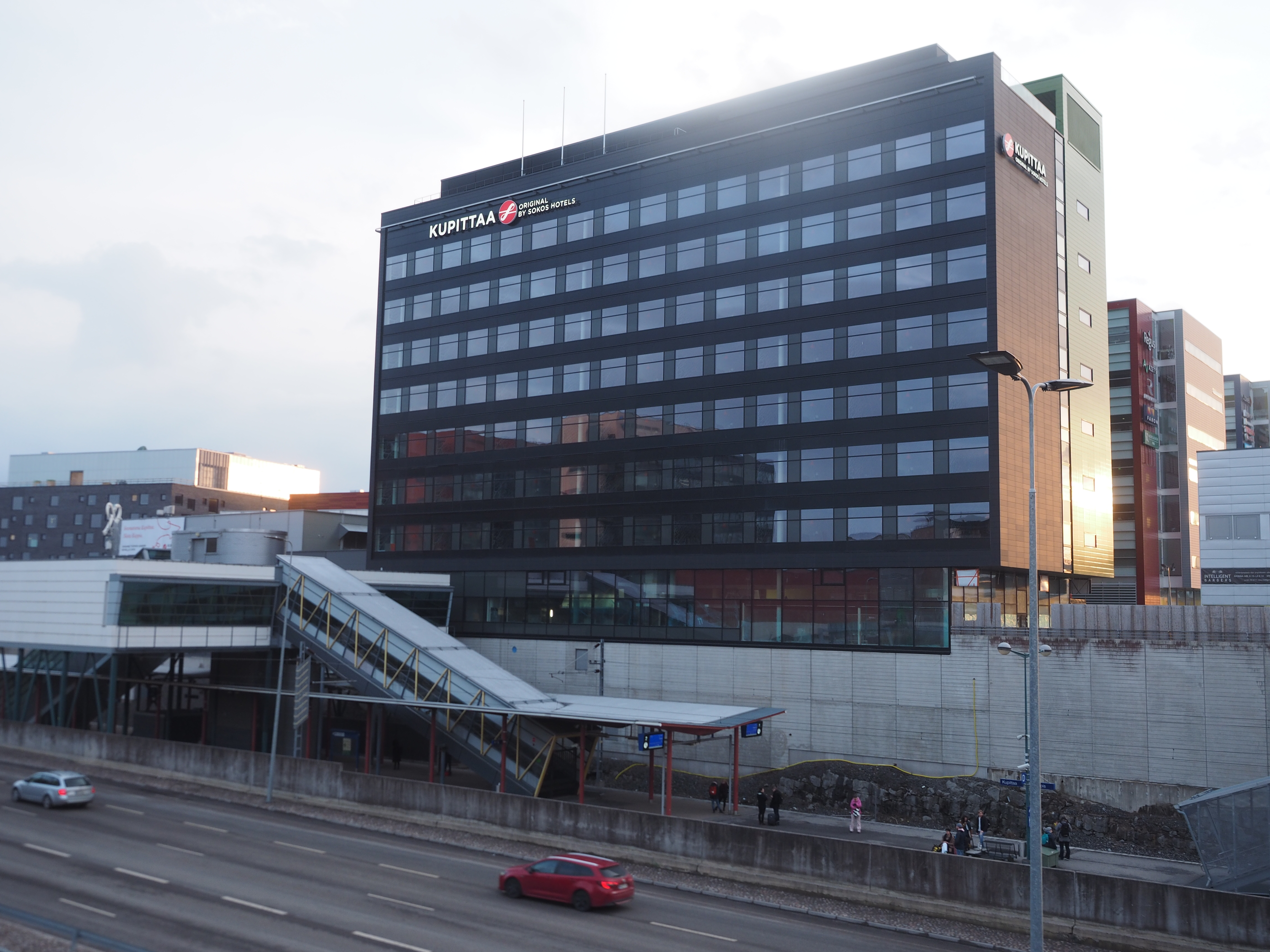
Sokos Hotel Kupittaa, Turku

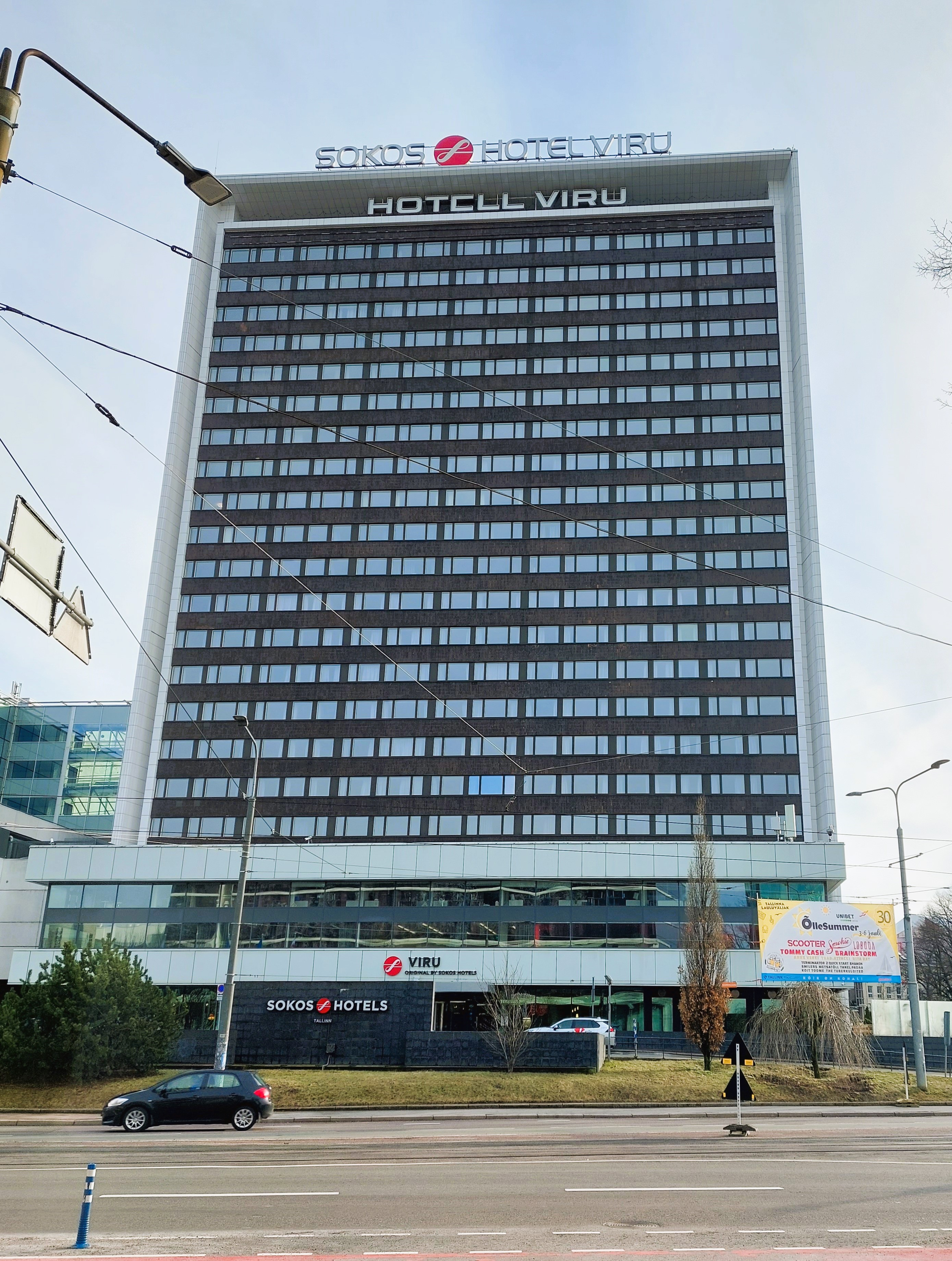
Sokos Hotel Viru, Tallinn, Estonia

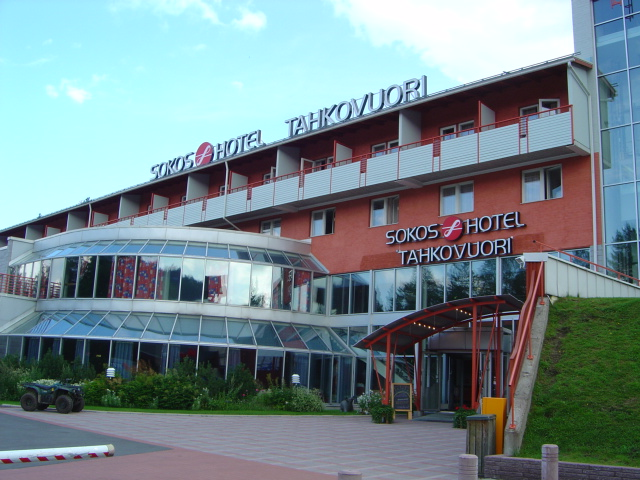
Sokos Hotel Tahkovuori, Nilsiä

== See also ==
- S Group
- Sokos
