= Toppila =

- District of Oulu
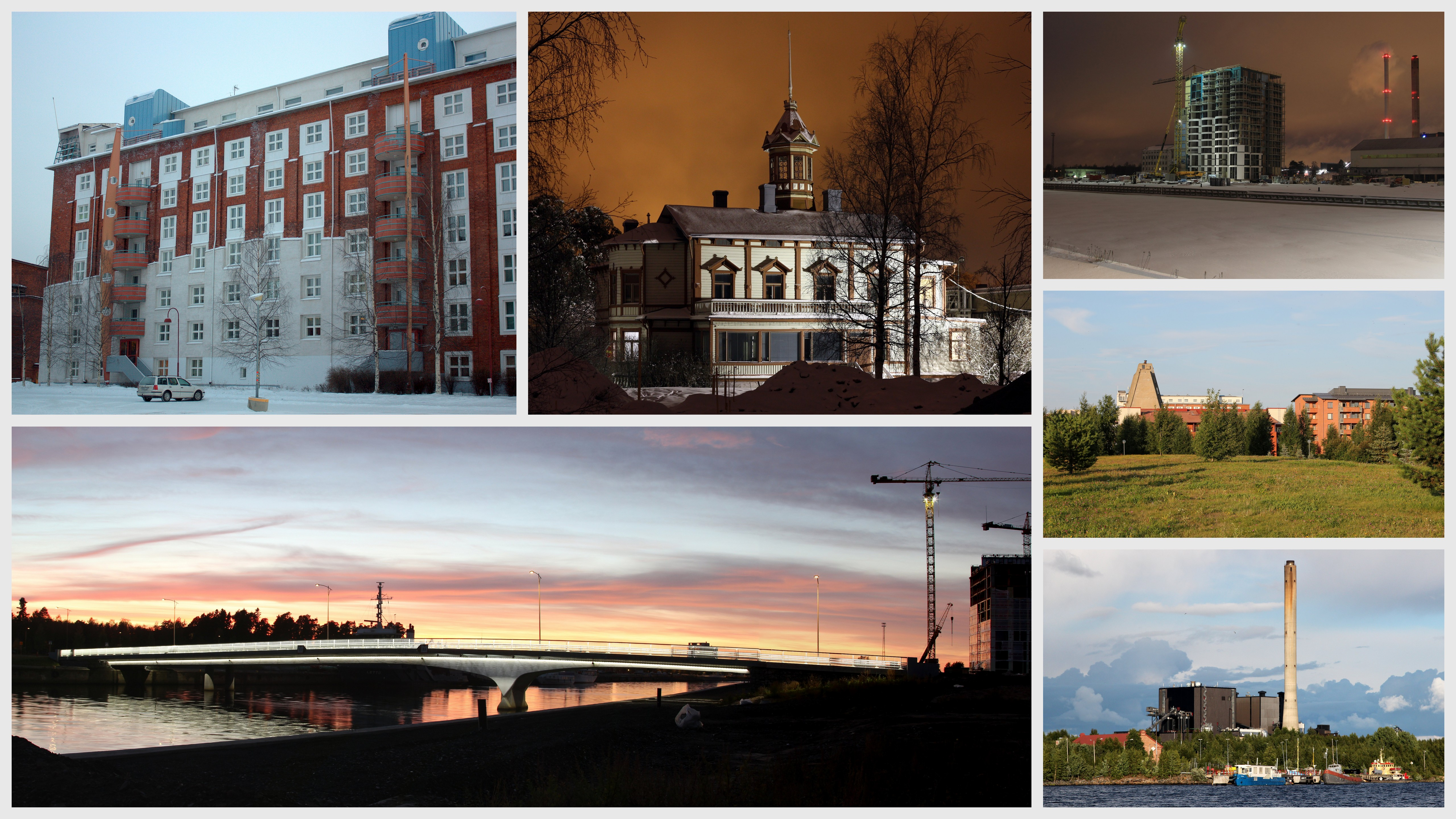
- Interactive map of Toppila
- Country: Finland
- City: Oulu
- Areas of Oulu: Koskela area

Population (2013)
  - Total: 3 992
- Postal code: 90520

Toppila is a district of Oulu, Finland. It is bounded by the Toppilansalmi strait in the south and west, railway in the east and the Taskila district in the north. The Möljä Bridge over the Toppilansalmi strait connects Toppila with the Toppilansaari district.

Historically Toppila has been an industrial district with the residential areas built mainly along the railway. The Meri-Toppila residential neighbourhood in the northern part of Toppila was built on the site of the former Toppila pulp mill. The pulp mill was established by English company, Peter Dixon & Son Ltd. The pulp mill was operative in the year 1931-1985. The former Toppila harbour areas are being converted into residential areas in the southern part of district. The Toppila Power Station is located in between these new residential neighbourhoods.
