= Hietasaari, Oulu =

Hietasaari
- District of Oulu
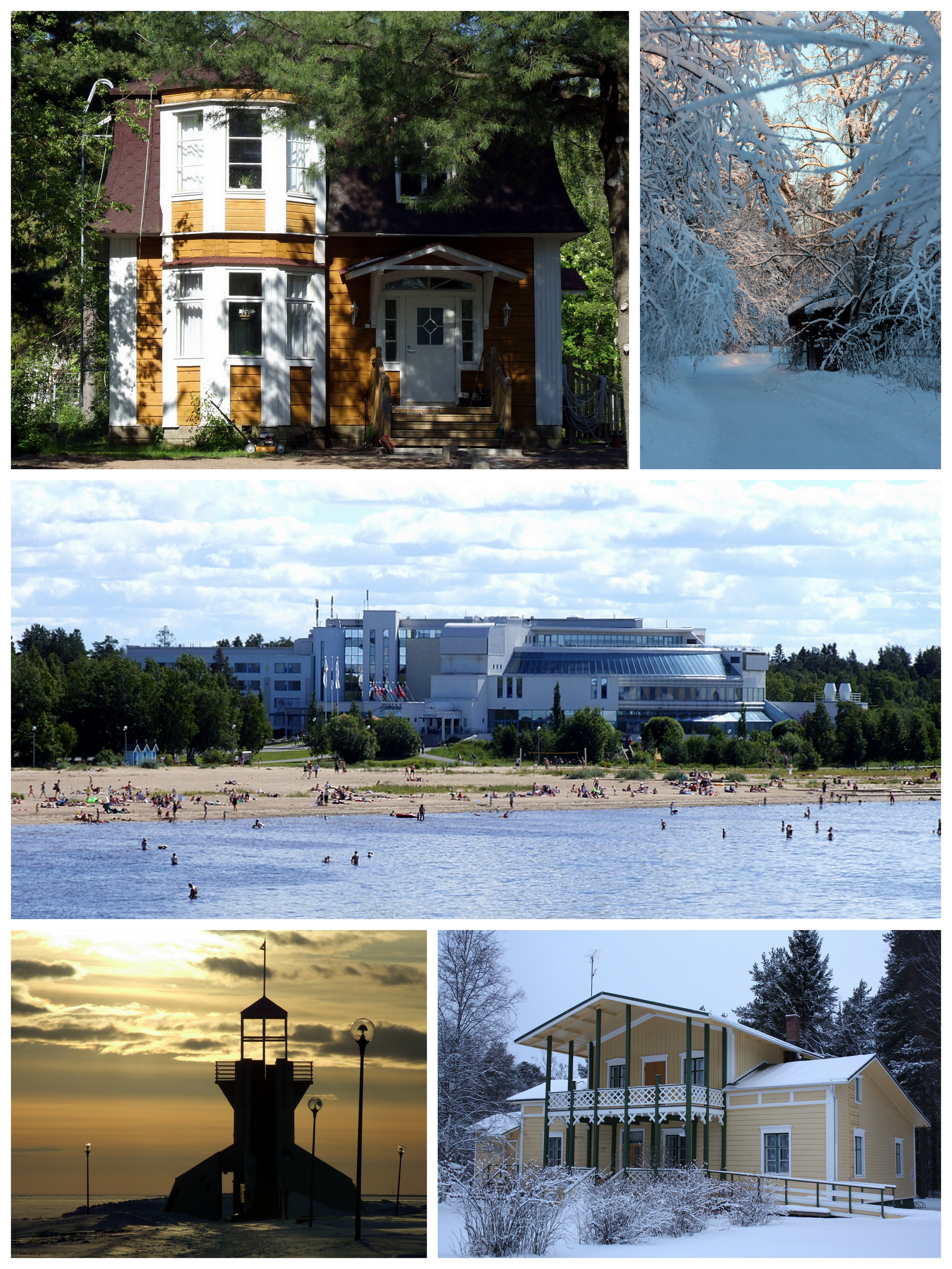
- Interactive map of Hietasaari
- Country: Finland
- City: Oulu
- Areas of Oulu: Tuira area

Population (2013)
  - Total: 54
- Postal code: 90510

Hietasaari is district in the Tuira area in the city of Oulu, Finland. The district consists of Mustasaari and Hietasaari islands, separated by the Mustasalmi strait, together with some smaller islands. Hietasaari is zoned as recreation area with only few people living in the district permanently.

Historically Hietasaari has been a villa area and there are still a few old villas left in both of the islands. The Nallikari beach and camping site is located in the Mustasaari island. Also near the beach is a spa hotel, Sokos Hotel Eden, and miscellaneous tourist activities.
