= S Group =

Finnish retailing cooperative organisation

- Company type: Cooperative
- Industry: Retail, Horeca
- Founded: 1904; 122 years ago
- Headquarters: Helsinki, Finland
- Key people: Hannu Krook, SOK CEO
- Products: Groceries, hardware, consumer durables, services.
- Revenue: €11.71 billion (2019)
- Net income: €355 million (2018)
- Number of employees: 37,283 (2018)
- Website: s-ryhma.fi/en

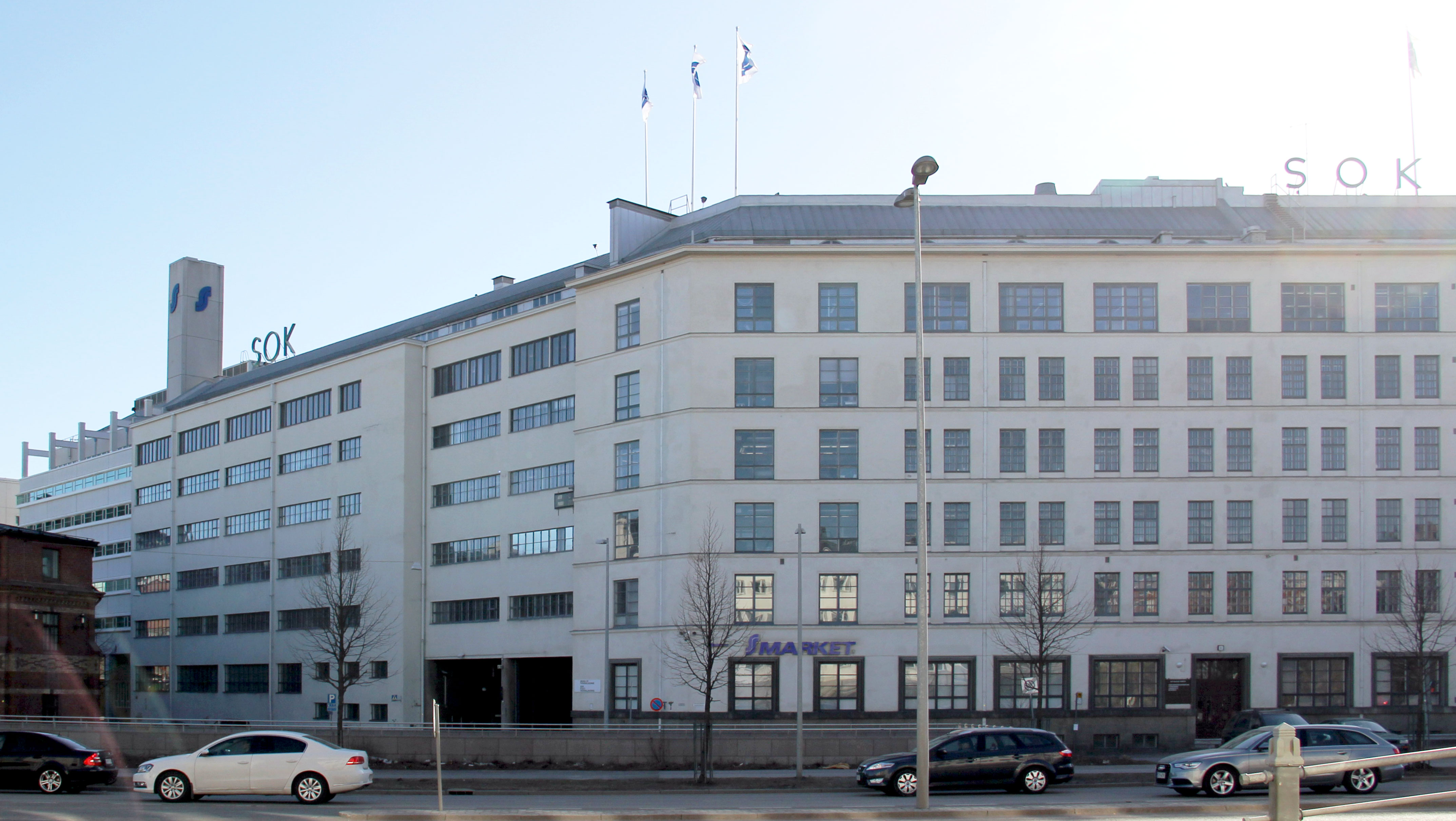
S Group headquarters in Vallila, Helsinki.

The S Group (Finnish: S-ryhmä, Swedish: S-gruppen) is a Finnish retailing cooperative organisation with its head office in Helsinki. Founded in 1904, it consists of 19 regional cooperatives operating all around Finland in addition to SOK, Suomen Osuuskauppojen Keskuskunta (The Central Finnish Cooperative Society). S Group operates in the markets for groceries, consumer durables, service station, hotel and restaurant services. It is engaged in close competition with Kesko, with which it shares an oligopolistic position in many of the markets it operates in.

The group has businesses in Finland and Estonia. The S Group also had businesses in Latvia and Lithuania, but announced withdrawal from these markets in May 2017. It also withdrew from the Russian market in 2022.

The organisation's member (loyalty) card is called S-Etukortti.

== Ownership ==
A client can invest a small sum on the local co-operative and become a client-owner. (The exact sum is decided by the local co-operative board and varies significantly depending on local conditions.) A client-owner gets a membership card, S-Etukortti, which functions as a debit or credit card and gives access to special client-owner bargains. For the sums spent in S Group stores, Bonus is paid back to the client into the account at S-Bank. The Bonus percentage varies from 1% to 5% depending on the sum spent. S-Bank pays an interest that is competitive with interests paid by general banks into savings accounts. S-Etukortti is not a regular "loyalty card" as it represents actual monetary investment and the return is formally profit, not discount.

== Corporate ==
In 2012, 35 Members of Parliament were representatives in the S Group or Tradeka (Siwa) corporate governance.

== Local co-operatives ==
The S Group consists of 19 regional co-operative enterprises and 7 local co-operative enterprises. In total, these had 2.4 million individual members in 2018, a number that has grown from 1.2 million in 2003. In 2018, 329 million euros of Bonus was paid.

== Supermarkets ==
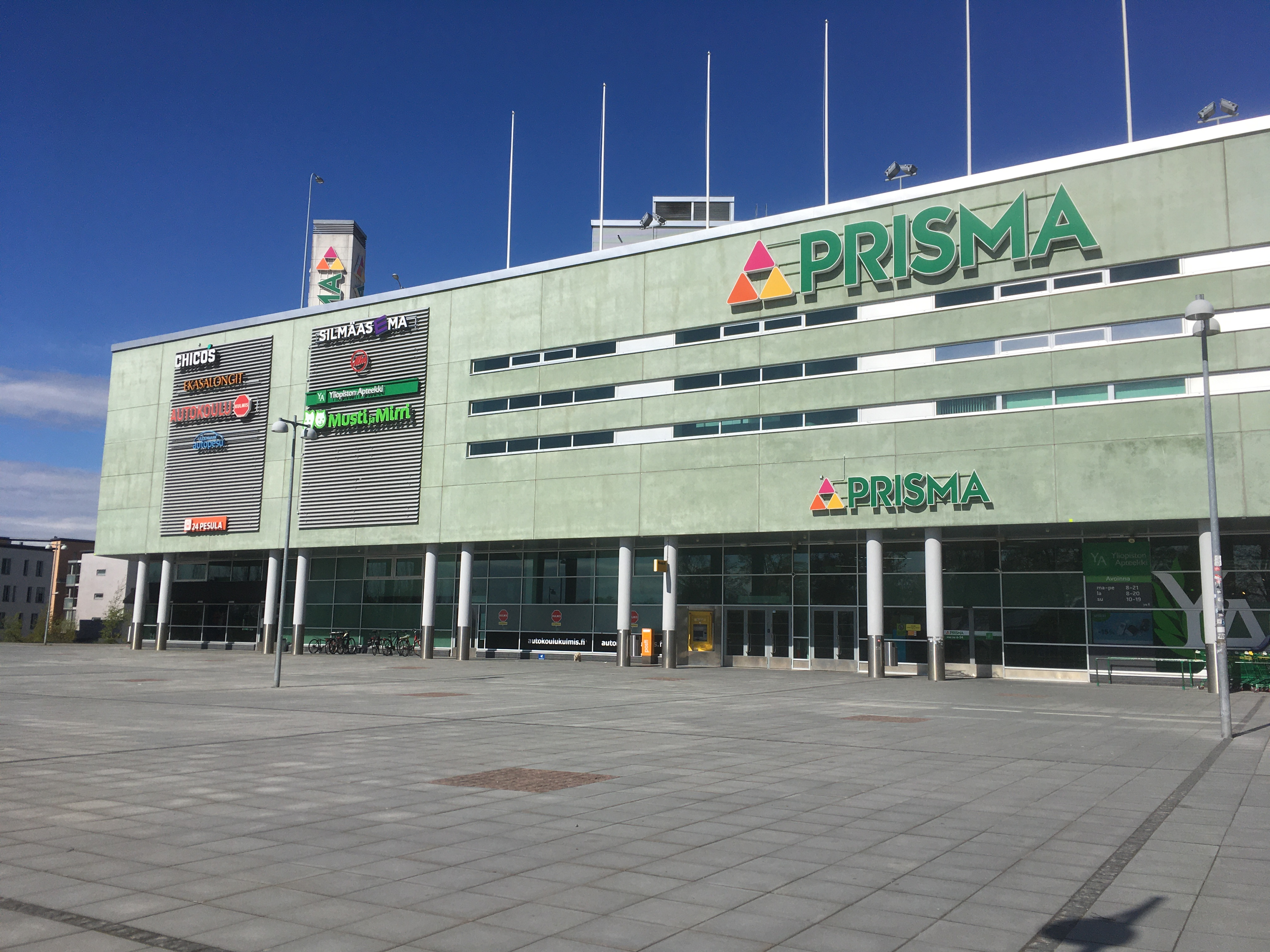
Prisma hypermarket in Viikki, Helsinki.

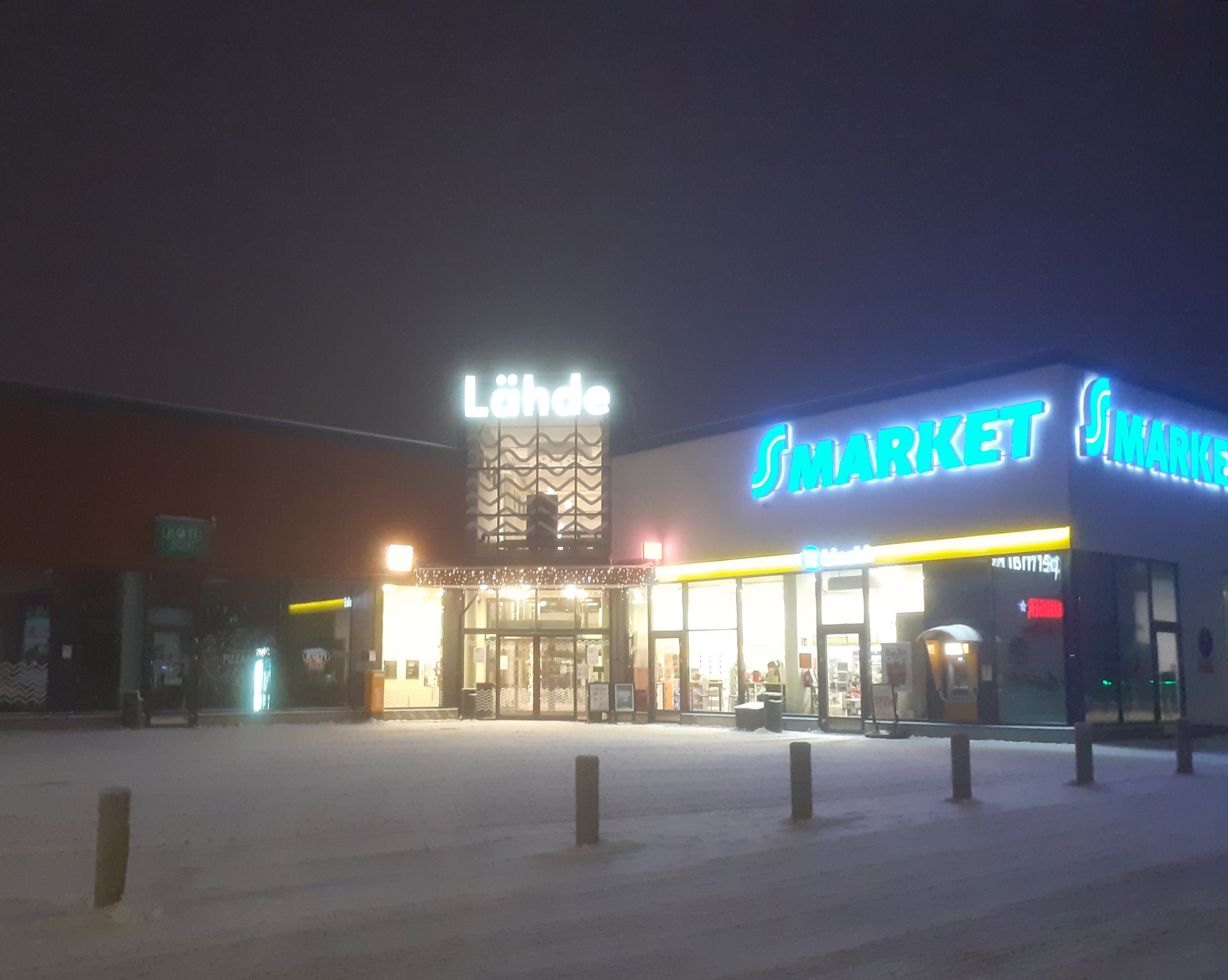
S-market at the Lähde shopping center in Rajamäki, Nurmijärvi.

The S Group operates five distinct chains of supermarkets:

- Sale – a chain of small grocery stores, mainly located in the countryside, small towns and suburbs with an emphasis on service rather than selection. Sale stores often only provide everyday groceries. There are about 240 Sale stores in Finland.
- Alepa – this is the equivalent for Sale in the Greater Helsinki region – there are about 110 Alepa stores in Helsinki and the neighbouring cities.
- S-market – larger supermarkets with a better selection of goods for sale, and often providing additional services. This is the largest of the S Group's supermarket chains, with nearly 400 stores around Finland. According to HOK-Elanto cooperative, Klaukkala would get another S-market in addition to the existing one, but it will become the largest S-market to match its size and product range with Prisma.
- Prisma – a hypermarket chain with about 90 stores around Finland and Estonia in major cities. Formerly, the chain also operated in Latvia, Lithuania and Russia.
- Food Market Herkku - premier food market operating in the Finnish metropolitan area (Helsinki, Espoo, Vantaa), Oulu, Tampere and Turku.

The largest sales revenues are from S-market's (49%) and from Prisma's 39%.

The S Group's supermarkets retail the general private brands Rainbow and Kotimaista for products made in Finland, and the no-frills X-tra range in partnership with Coop Trading — a Nordic purchasing organisation for co-operatives. Non-food products are marketed under the House name.

The S Group has grown significantly in Finland in recent years, growing both organically and by acquisition.

The S Group is a founding member of the Finnish trade association for plant-based foods, Pro Vege. In 2022, the S Group pledged that plant-based products would account for 65% of its food sales by 2030. In 2023, it reported that plant-based foods accounted for 60% of sales.

== Modernist architecture ==
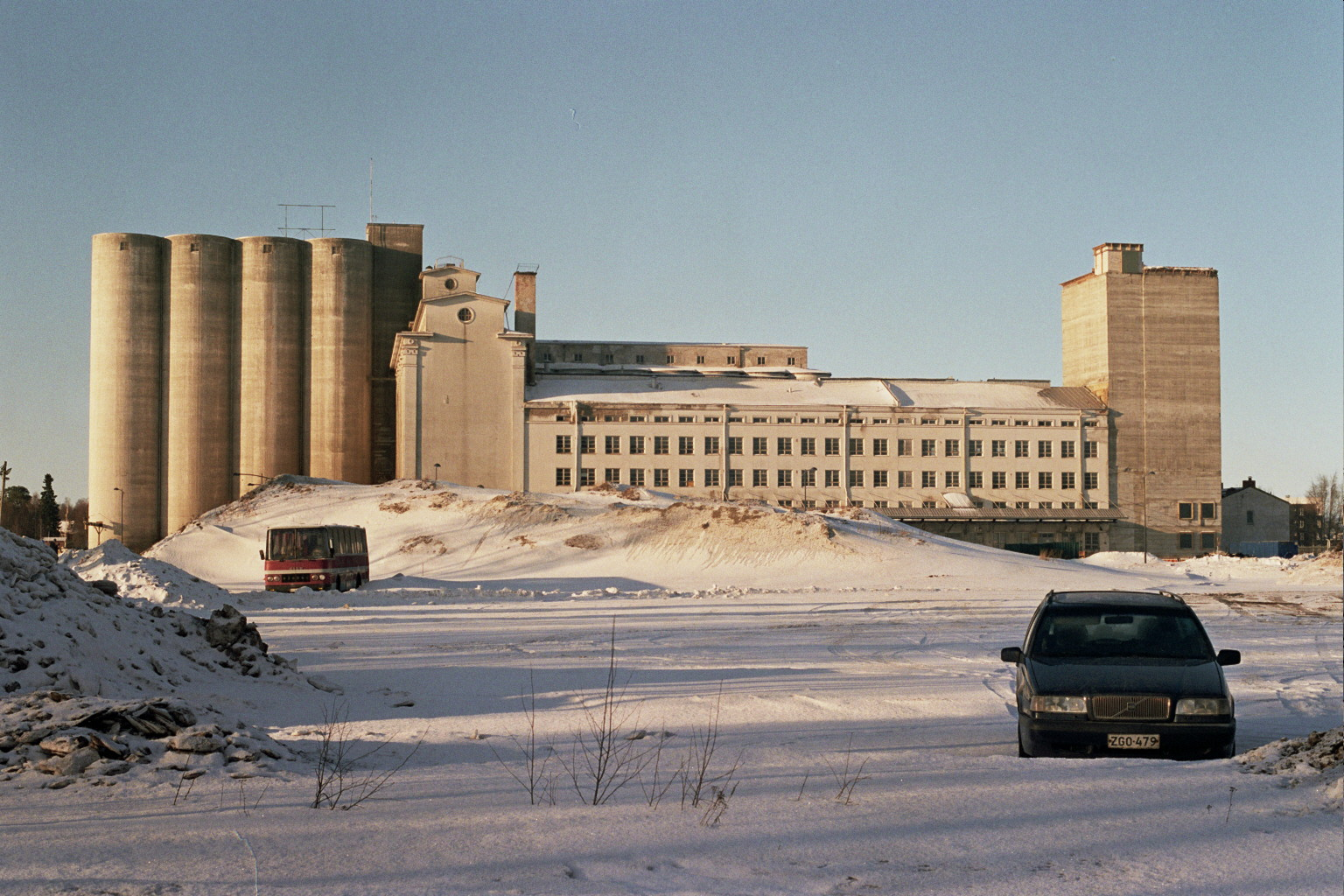
SOK mill in Toppila, Oulu (1929). Architect Erkki Huttunen (1901–1956).

SOK has a key position in the history of Finnish architecture due to its policy in the late 1920s and 1930s of designing cutting-edge Modernist architecture, epitomized by a Functionalist aesthetic of white buildings. The style is called osuuskauppafunkis (Co-operative Store Functionalism) in Finland. The key architect designing for SOK in the initial years was Erkki Huttunen (1901–1956), who designed various types of buildings for the company: from grain silos and mills to local village shops. Among his best-known works for SOK are the Toppila mill (1929, pictured right), the SOK Offices and Warehouse (1937-38) in Oulu, the SOK Offices and Warehouse (1931) in Rauma, and the Aitta Cooperative Shop (1933) in Sauvo. Today, many of these buildings are protected by law.

== Other fields ==
The S Group also operates the Sokos chain of department stores, ABC service stations, the hotel chain Sokos Hotels, several brands of restaurants such as Rosso, Sevilla and Amarillo, the Agrimarket chain, which sells agricultural and DIY supplies, and a number of car dealerships for Peugeot.

== S-Bank ==
The S Group operates Finland's first so-called supermarket bank, the S-Bank (S-Pankki Oy).
