= List of shopping malls in Finland =

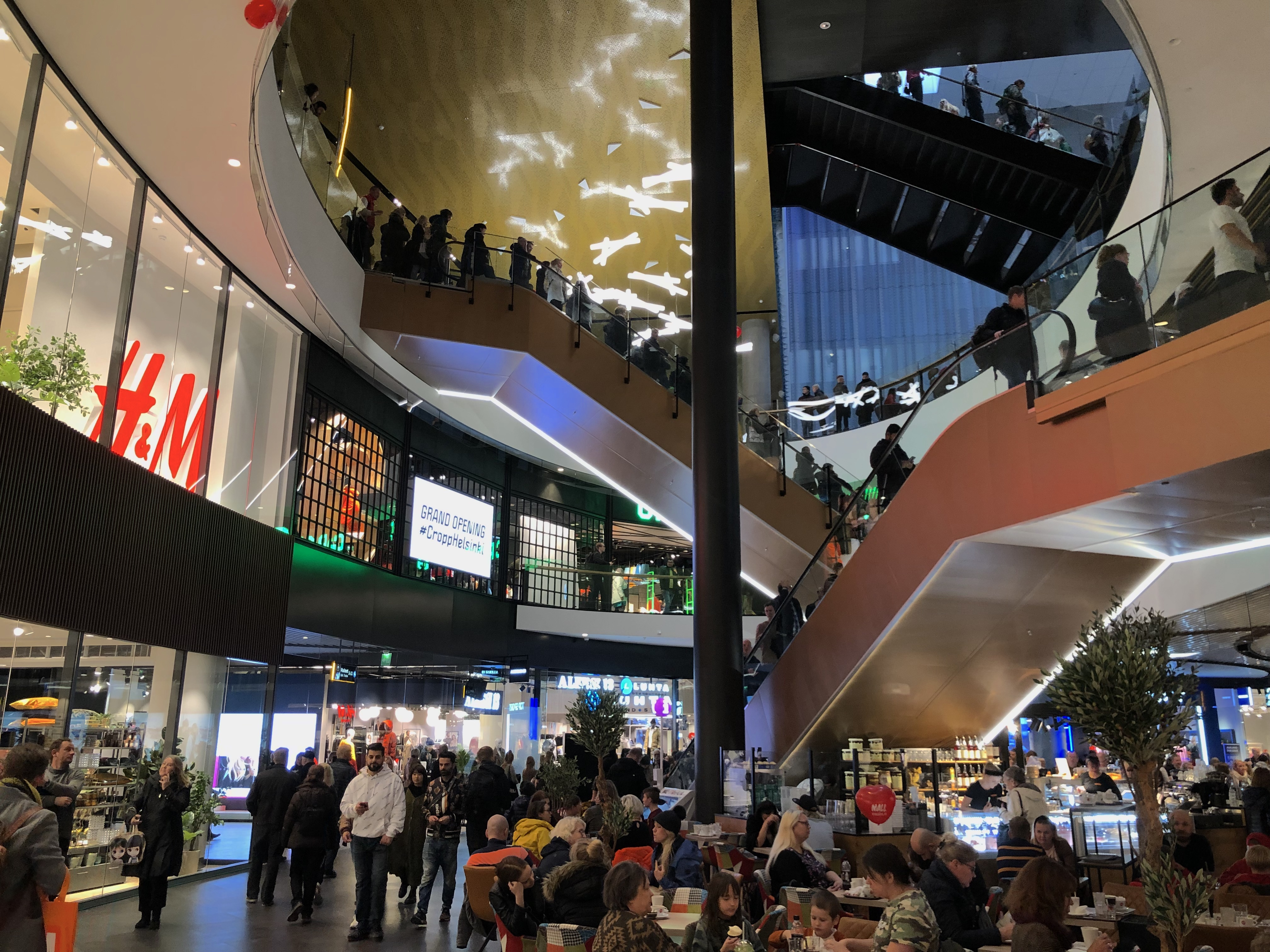
The interior structure of Mall of Tripla in Helsinki, Finland

Finland is home to fifty shopping malls, over half of which are located in the greater Helsinki area. The following is a list of all shopping malls in Finland, categorized by location.

== Helsinki area ==
- Ainoa
- Arabia
- Citycenter
- Columbus
- Dixi
- Easton Helsinki
- Entresse
- Flamingo
- Forum
- Galleria
- Grani
- Heikintori
- Hertsi
- Iso Omena
- Itis
- Jumbo
- Kampin Keskus
- Kaari
- Kluuvi
- Lauttis
- Länsiviitta
- Myyrmanni
- Puhos
- Redi
- Ristikko
- Ruoholahti
- Sello
- Tikkuri
- Tripla

== Kuopio area ==
- IsoCee
- Matkus
- Minna

== Oulu area ==
- Idea Park Oulu
- Valkea
- Zeppelin

== Tampere area ==
- Duo
- Ideapark Lempäälä
- Koskikeskus
- Like (Lielahtikeskus)
- Ratina
- Tullintori
- Veska
- Westeri

== Turku area ==
- Hansa
- Mylly
- Skanssi

== Rest of Finland ==
- Chydenia, Kokkola
- Goodman, Hämeenlinna
- IsoKarhu, Pori
- Lähde, Rajamäki
- Torikeskus, Jyväskylä
- Torikeskus, Seinäjoki
- Viiri, Klaukkala
