= Veska =

Veska may refer to:

- Véska, a village in Dolany (Olomouc District), Czech Republic
- Veska, a fictional character in 1956 Bulgarian film Item One
- Veska (shopping mall), a shopping mall in Pirkkala, Finland
