= Hertsi =

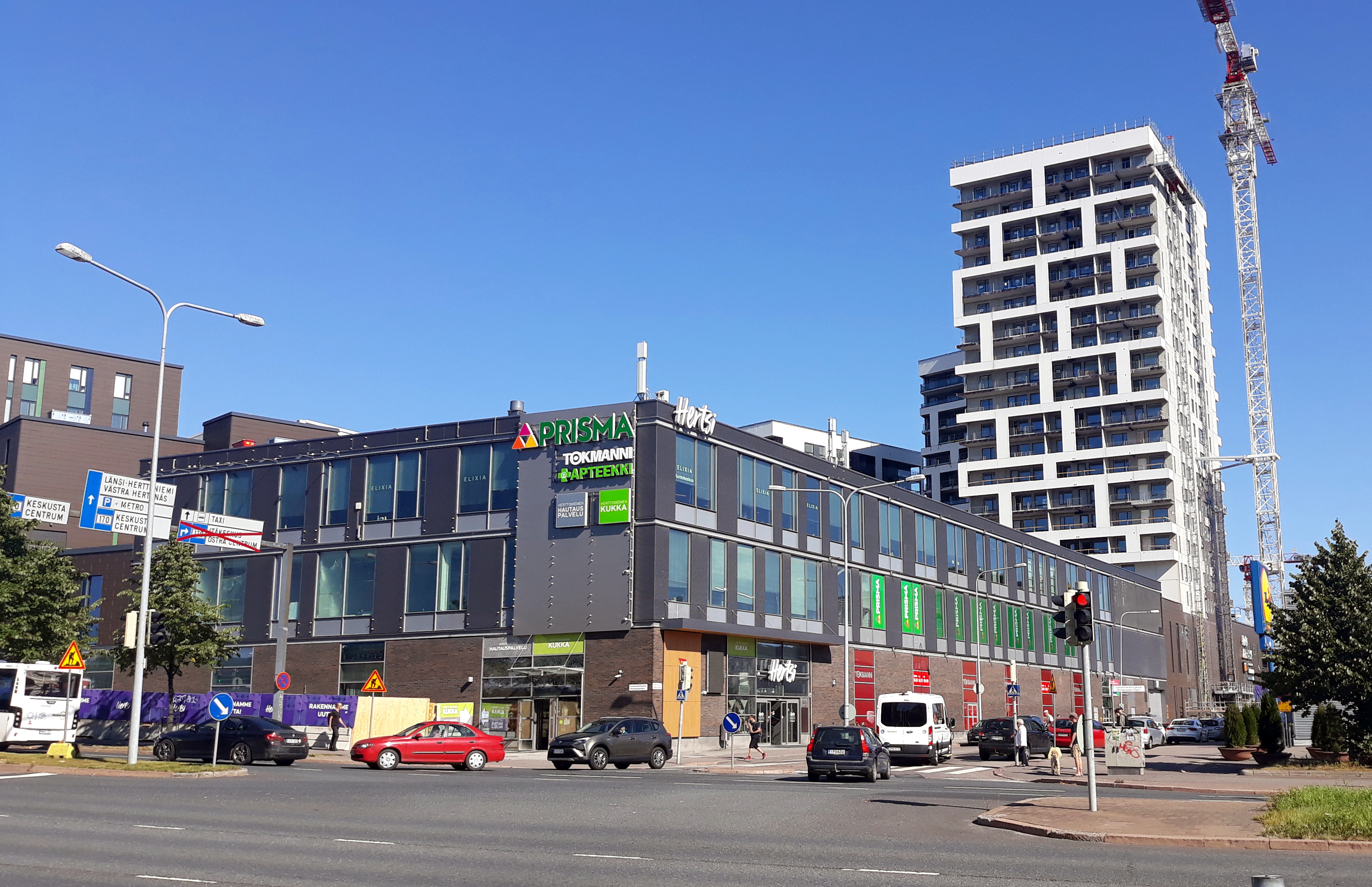
- Shopping center Hertsi
- Location: Herttoniemi, Helsinki, Finland
- Coordinates: 60°11′41″N 25°2′2″E
- Opened: 19 March 2020
- Owner: Henki-Fennia; Aktia Henkivakuutus; Yleisradio Retirement Fund eQ Liikekiinteistöt
- Num. of stores: about 50
- Floor area: 23,000 square metres
- Floors: 4
- Website: hertsi.fi

Hertsi is a shopping center located in Herttoniemi, Helsinki, Finland, the construction of which was completed in the spring of 2020. It is located along Itäväylä, quite close to Herttoniemi metro station. In addition to grocery stores and restaurants, the shopping center includes a library, youth facilities and a kindergarten to be opened later. The previously built shopping center Megahertsi is part of the center. In 2021, three apartment buildings with a total of 250 apartments will be completed on the shopping center site.

The lowest store floor in the shopping center is the street level, whose largest store is Tokmanni. On the first floor, on the Prisma level, are located, among other things, Prisma, Kotipizza, Fafa's, Arnolds, the pet store Musti ja Mirri, Silmäasema and Veikkaus Pelaamo. The tenants on the second floor include Elixia, Fitness24Seven, Herttoniemi Library and the City of Helsinki's youth services.

The mall opened on March 19, 2020. The opening ceremony was controversial event, because was held in the midst of a coronavirus epidemic despite recommendations to avoid major events.

== See also ==
- Itis shopping centre
