= Ideapark Lempäälä =

Coordinates: 61°21′41″N 23°47′44″E

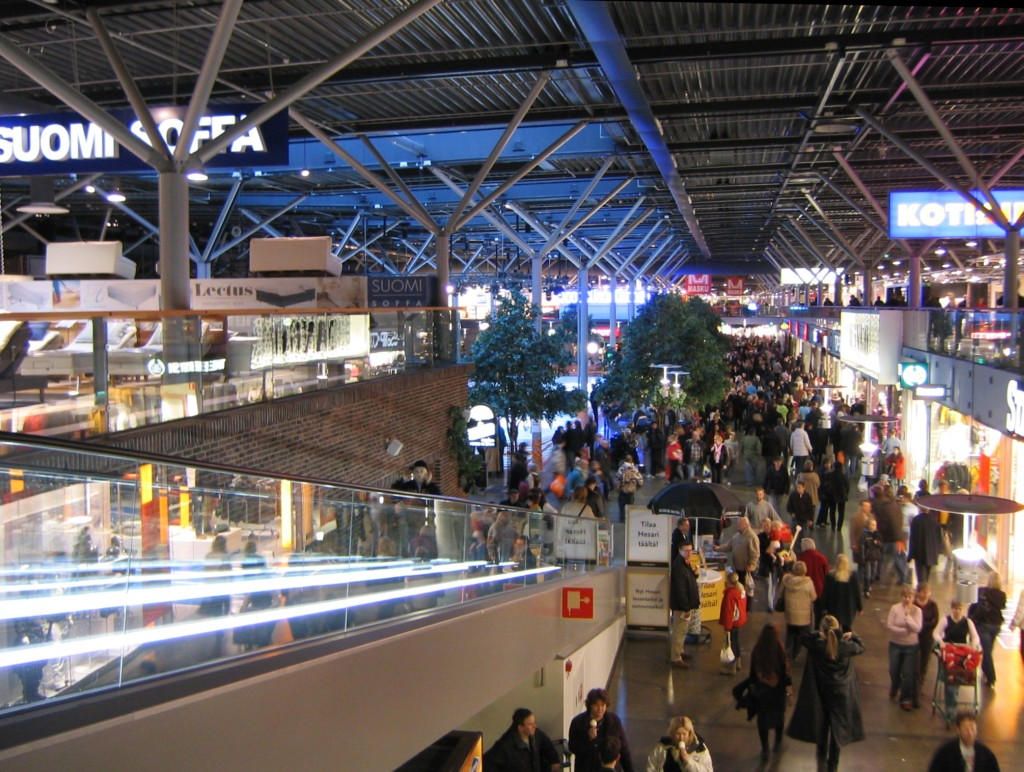
- Photo of Ideapark
- Location: Lempäälä, Finland
- Address: Ideaparkinkatu 4, 37570 Lempäälä
- Opened: December 1, 2006
- Num. of stores: c. 150
- Floor area: 103,027 square metres (1,108,970 sq ft)
- Floors: 2
- Website: ideapark.fi

Ideapark is a shopping mall in Lempäälä, Finland. It is the largest shopping centre in Finland. The mall was built on a greenfield site alongside the Helsinki–Tampere Highway (E12) approximately twelve kilometres south of Tampere, the capital of the Pirkanmaa region, and Tampere Airport in Pirkkala is about a 20-minute drive from Ideapark.

Lempäälä's Ideapark was opened for business on December 1, 2006. A new Ideapark was opened in Oulu in October 2014 and other one in Seinäjoki in October 2019.

The mall has a total floor space of 104,000 square metres, of which 91,712 square metres are the gross leasable area. By gross leasable area, it is the second largest shopping centre in Finland after the Sello in Leppävaara, Espoo.

== History ==
Toivo Sukari and Tamperean businessman Toni Virkkunen had the idea to build the Ideapark in 2003. Sukari, who also owns the Maskun Kalustetalo chain, took on the greatest financial responsibility and the role of a caretaker in the Ideapark project. At the end of 2004, he sold properties for about €25,000,000 to finance the construction of Ideapark. Outsiders had no faith in Ideapark, and no bank loan was received until two years after the start of the project.

An article by Etelä-Suomen Sanomat from July 2007 states that the construction costs of the project were approximately €120,000,000. Ideapark's rental income was reported to be approximately EUR 15 million per year and the total value approximately €200,000,000. There were 185 shops in Ideapark at that time. The Sukari and Viitala companies jointly own the Lempäälä Ideapark. Kiinteistö Oy Ideapark made a profit for the first time in 2009, when in the financial year ended January 2010 the profit amounted to €440,000, while in previous years the loss amounted to several million euros annually.

== See also ==
- List of shopping malls in Finland
  - Mall of Tripla
