= Mall of Scandinavia =

Westfield Mall of Scandinavia
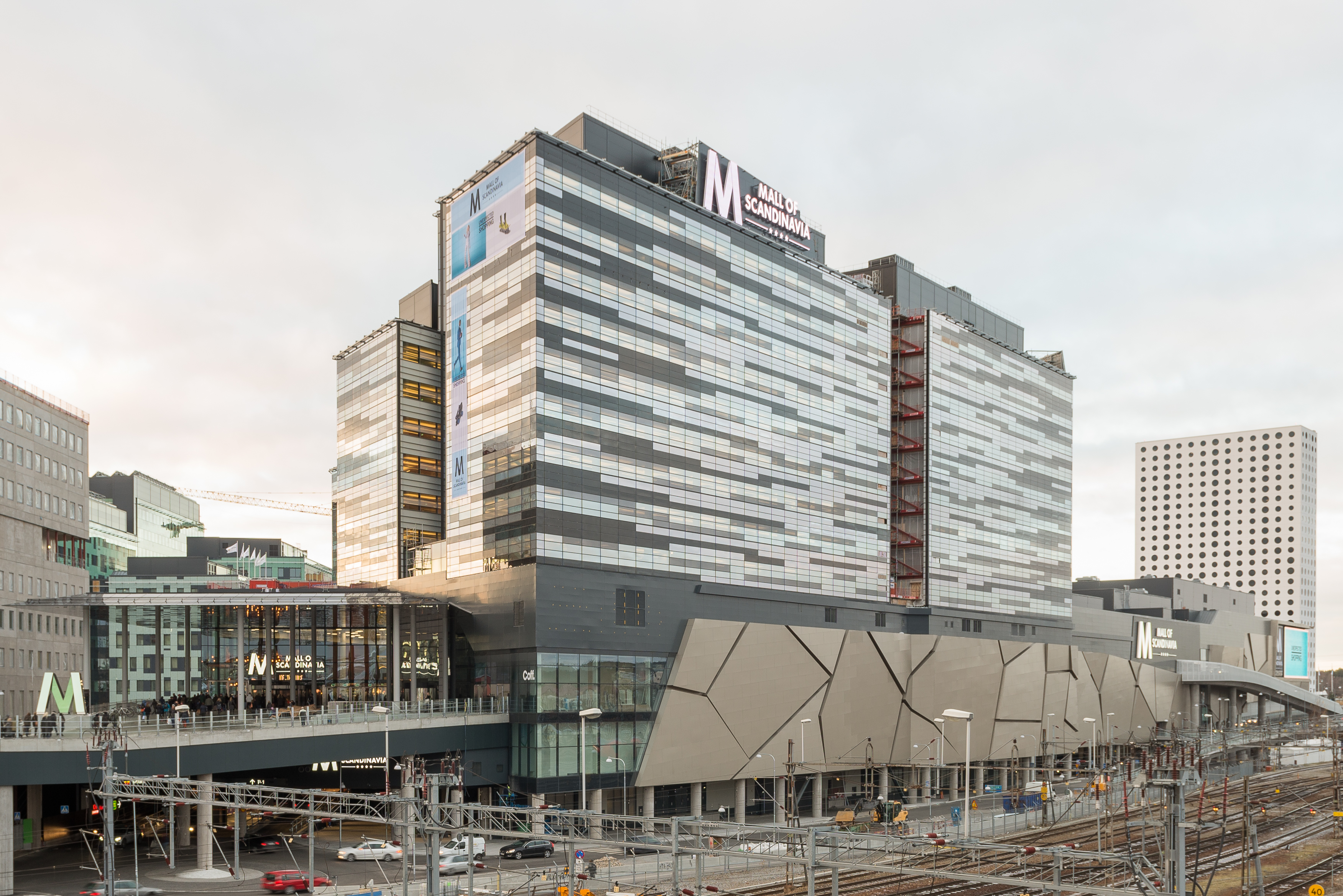
- Mall of Scandinavia in November 2015
- Location: Solna, Stockholm; Sweden
- Coordinates: 59°22′12″N 18°0′17″E
- Opened: 12 November 2015
- Developer: Peab
- Manager: Unibail-Rodamco-Westfield
- Owner: Unibail-Rodamco-Westfield
- Architect: Wingårdh arkitektkontor Benoy/BAU
- Num. of stores: 224
- Floor area: 101,048 m^{2} (1,087,670 sq ft)
- Floors: 4
- Parking: 3,700
- Public transit: Solna railway station, commuter rail (Storstockholms Lokaltrafik)
- Website: www.westfield.com/sweden/mallofscandinavia

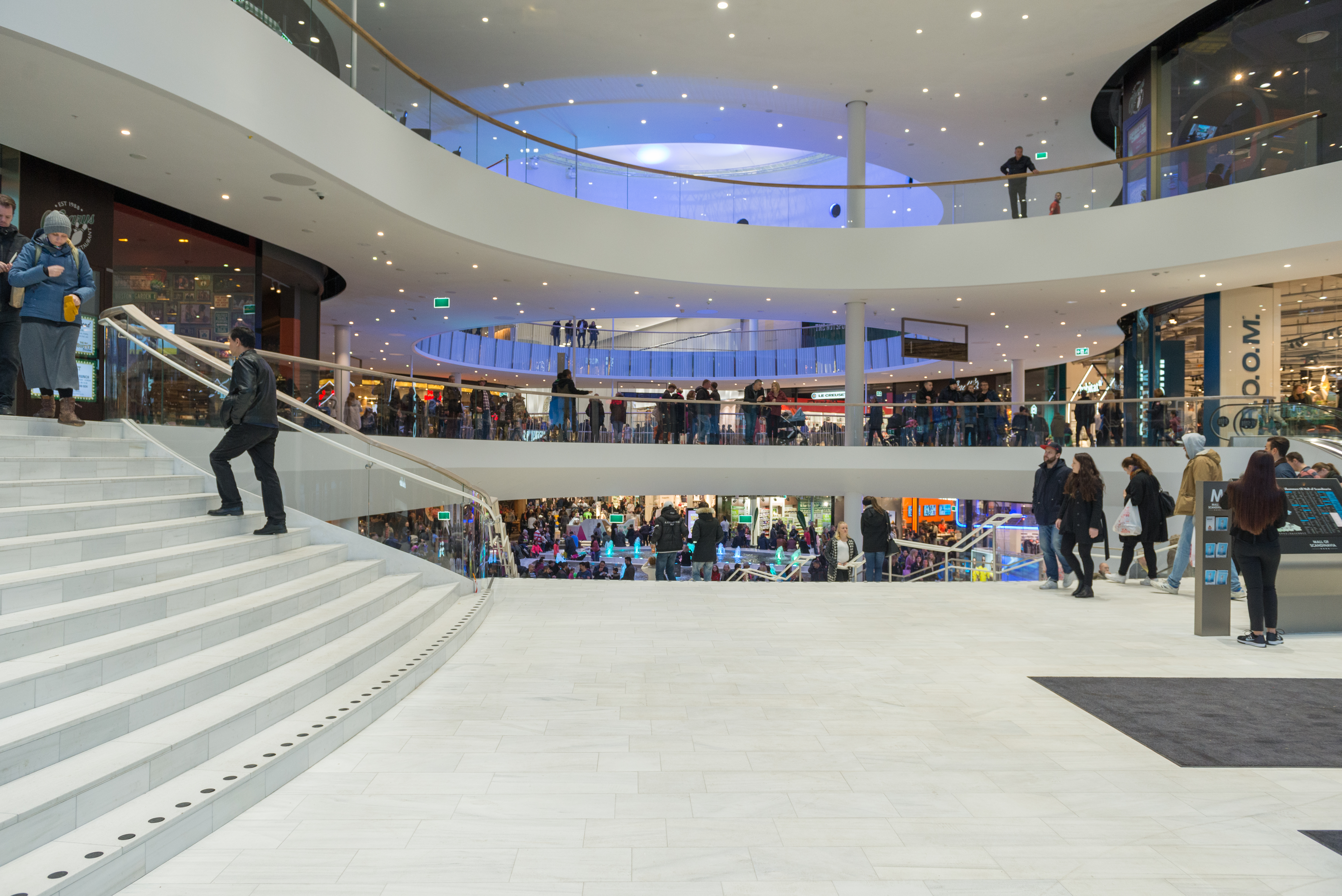
Interior of the mall

Westfield Mall of Scandinavia is a shopping mall located in Solna in Stockholm, Sweden. It was inaugurated on November 12, 2015, and is the fourth largest mall in the Nordic countries with 224 stores and restaurants, many of them with double-height storefronts up to 8 m (26 ft) tall. 50,000 shoppers showed up to the opening of the mall. About 20-25% of the leasable area is dedicated to experiences, there are 44 restaurants and a 15 screen multiplex with the first purpose-built commercial IMAX theatre in the Nordic region (and also the second overall IMAX theatre in Sweden after the Cosmonova planetarium at the Swedish Museum of Natural History). The shopping mall has 3,700 parking spaces and a retail gross leasable area of 101,048 m^{2} (1,087,670 sq ft). The building also house an additional 42,000 m^{2} (450,000 sq ft) of office space and condominiums.

The project cost is estimated at SEK 6.1 billion and the mall is owned by Unibail-Rodamco with Peab as the main contractor. Located near the Solna commuter rail station, approximately seven minutes from the Stockholm city centre, and the E4 highway, it is part of the Arenastaden project, which includes 450,000 m^{2} (4,800,000 sq ft) of new office space, the Friends national football arena and 1,500 residential units.

In 2018, Unibail-Rodamco merged with Westfield Corp, bringing the mall under the new company. The mall changed its name from Mall of Scandinavia to Westfield Mall of Scandinavia on September 28, 2019.

== See also ==
- List of shopping centres in Sweden
- List of largest shopping centres in the Nordic countries
