= Lobby (room) =

Building entry room

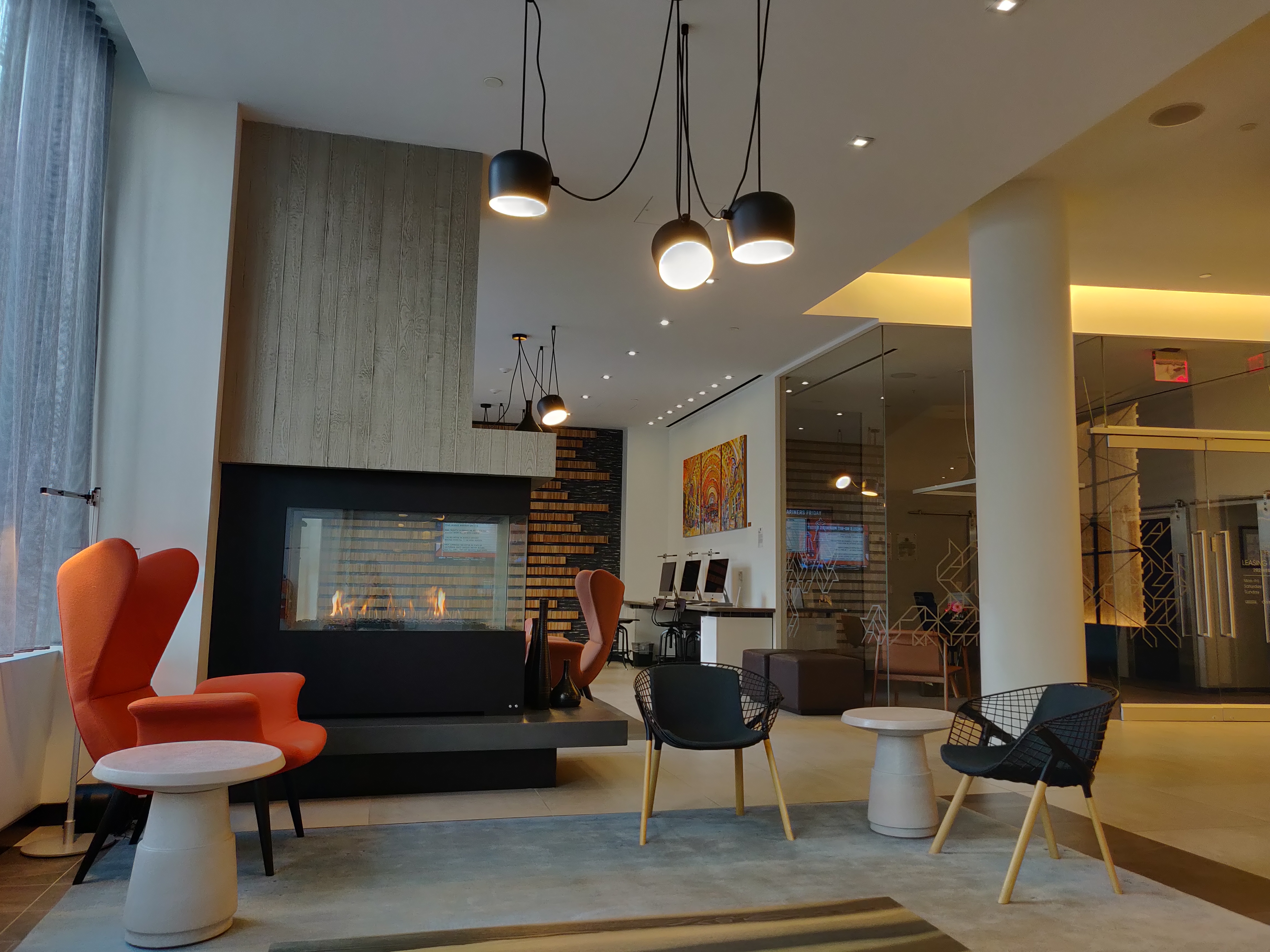
Lobby of a contemporary apartment building in Washington, D.C.

A lobby is a room in a building used for entry from the outside, sometimes referred to as a foyer, entryway, reception area, or entrance hall. It is often a large room or complex of rooms in a large building such as a theatre, opera house, or movie theater adjacent to the auditorium. It may be a repose area for spectators, especially used before performance and during intermissions, but can also be a place of celebrations or festivities after performance. In other buildings, such as office buildings or condominiums, lobbies can function as gathering spaces between the entrance and elevators to other floors.

Since the mid-1980s, there has been a growing trend to think of lobbies as more than just ways to get from the door to the elevator but instead as social spaces and places of commerce. Some research has even been done to develop scales to measure lobby atmosphere to improve hotel lobby design. Designers of office buildings, hotels, and skyscrapers sometimes go to great lengths to decorate their lobbies to create the right impression and convey an image.

== Etymology ==
The word "lobby" comes from Medieval Latin lobia, laubia or lobium.

== Gallery ==
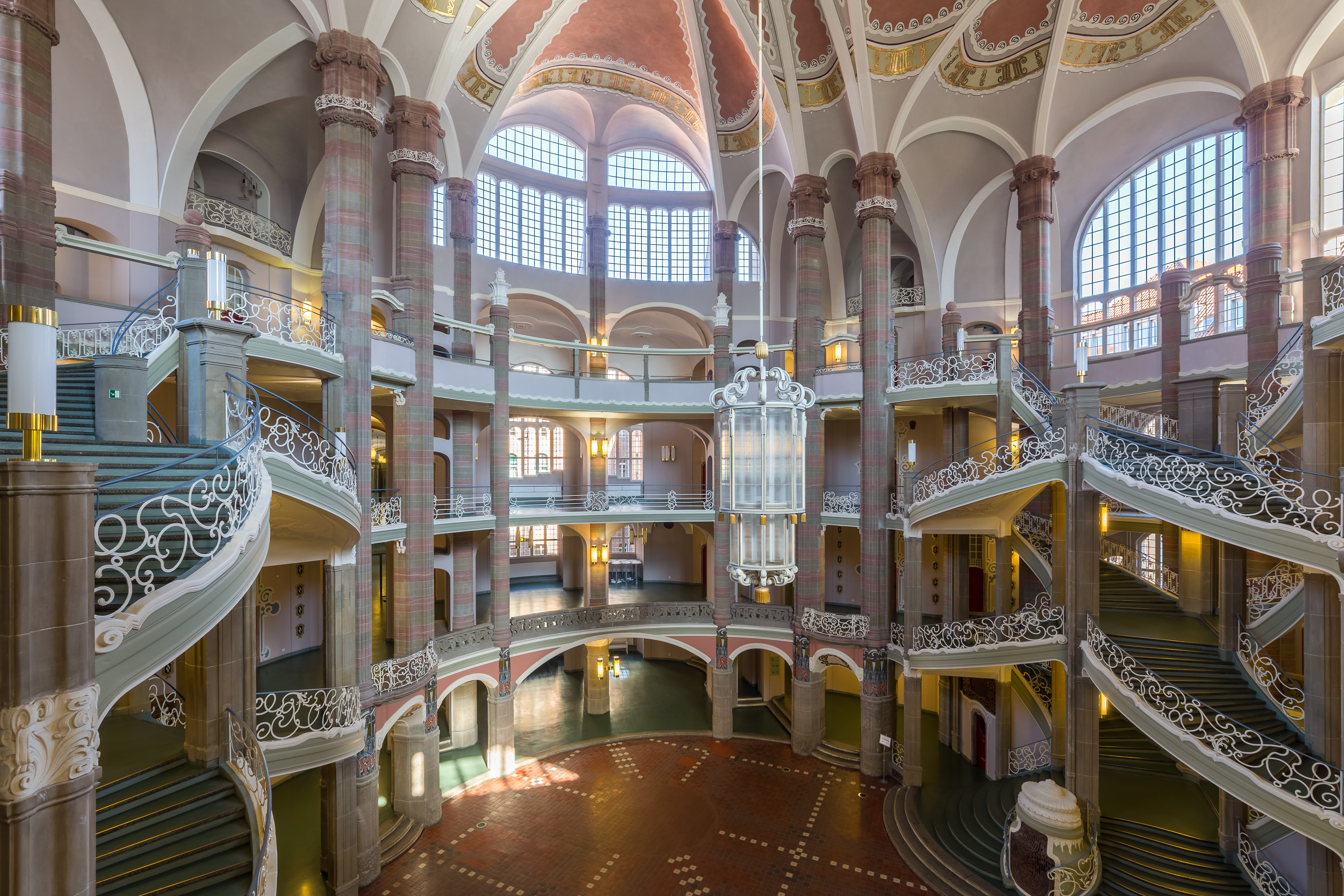
Landgericht Berlin in Germany

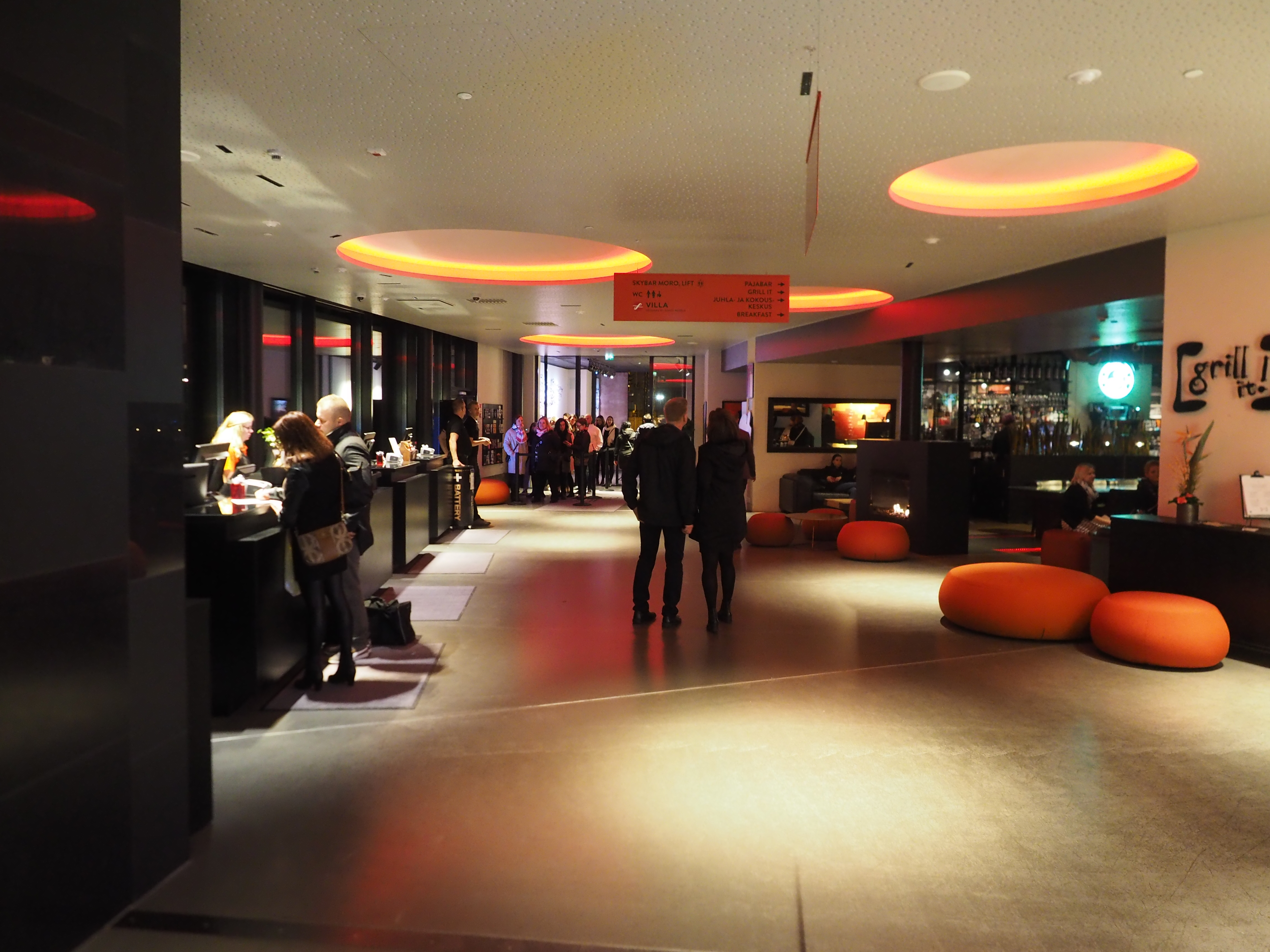
Lobby at the Hotel Torni Tampere, Finland

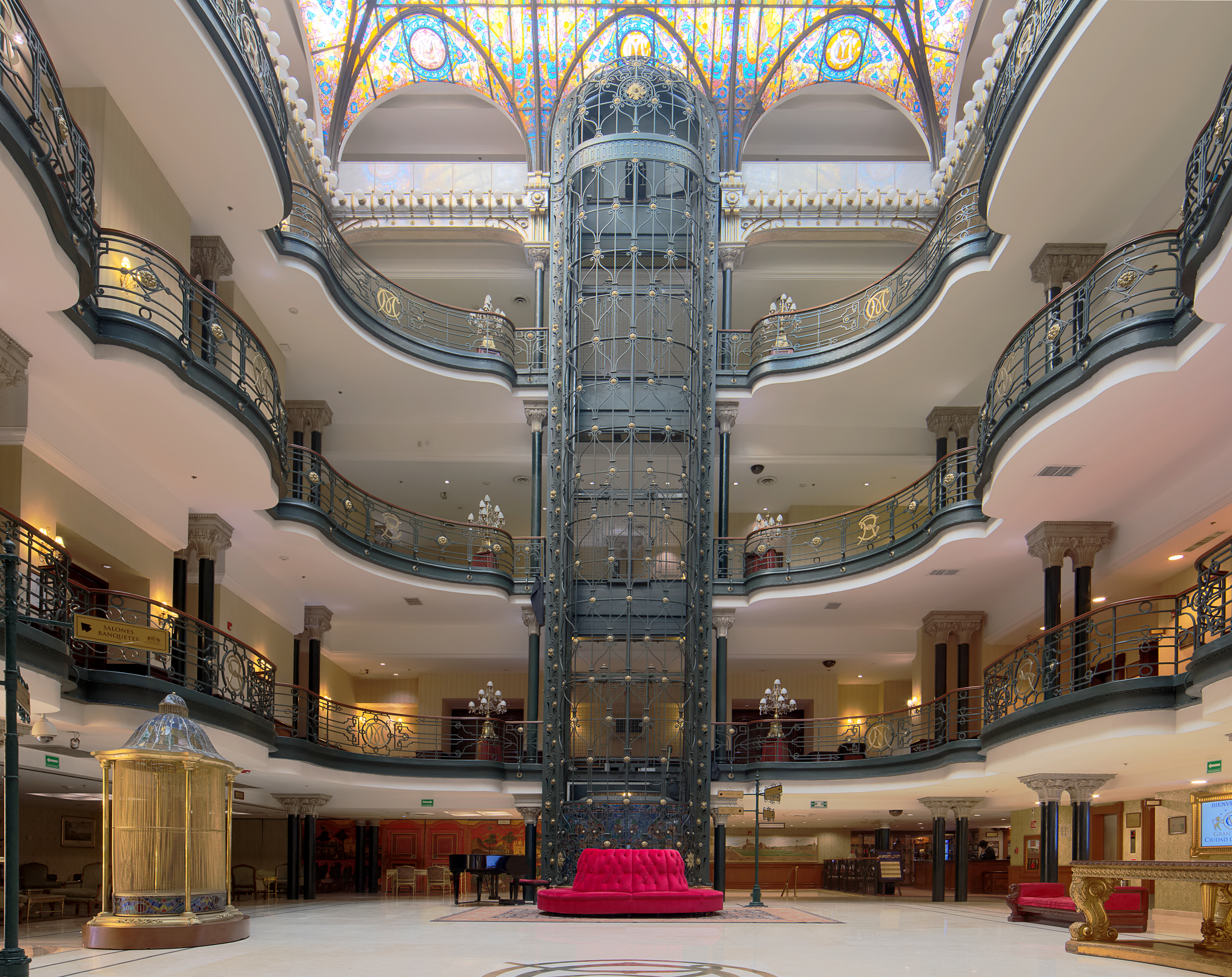
Gran Hotel Ciudad de Mexico

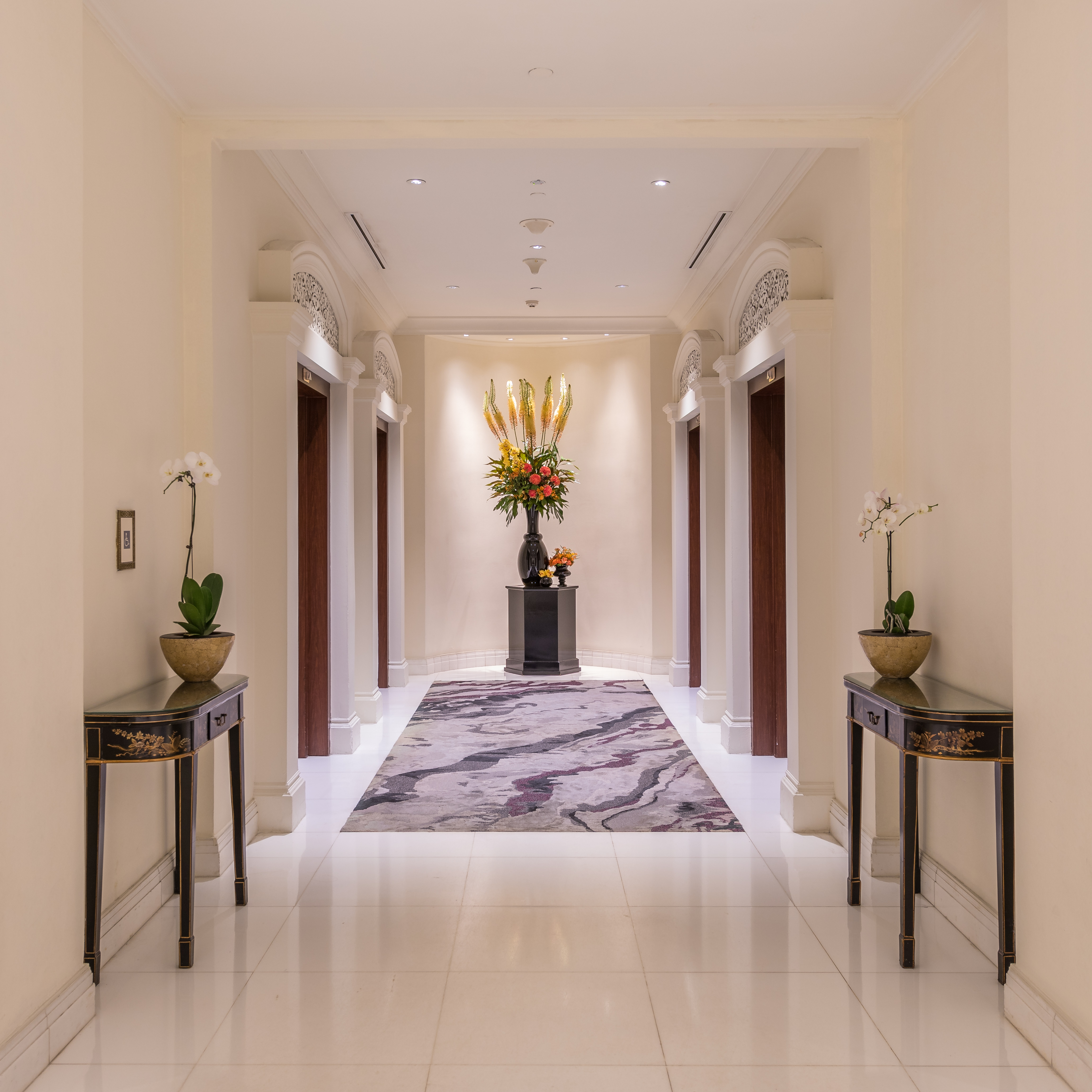
Elevator lobby at the InterContinental Hotel, Singapore

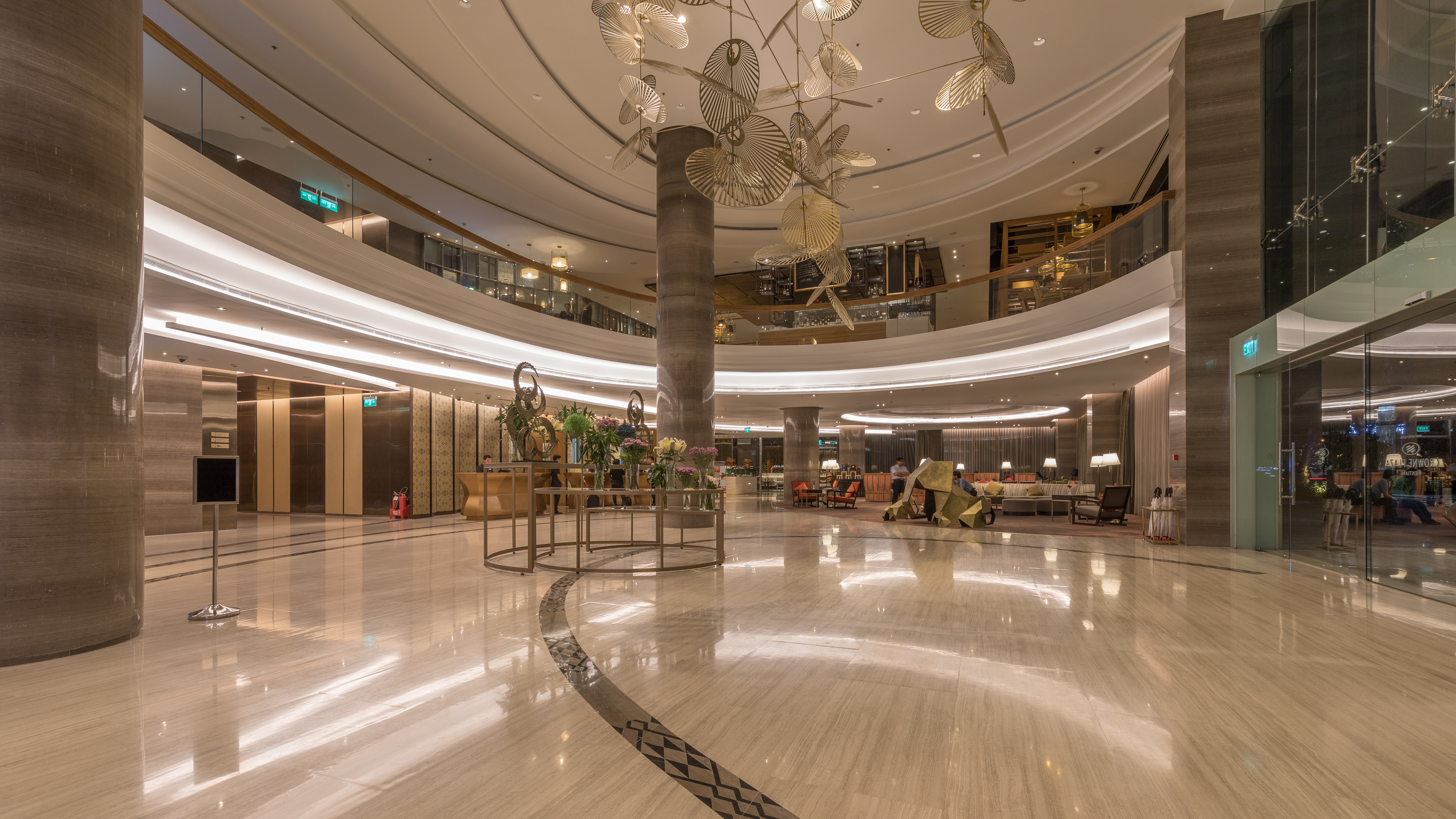
Lobby of the Crowne Plaza Vientiane hotel in Laos

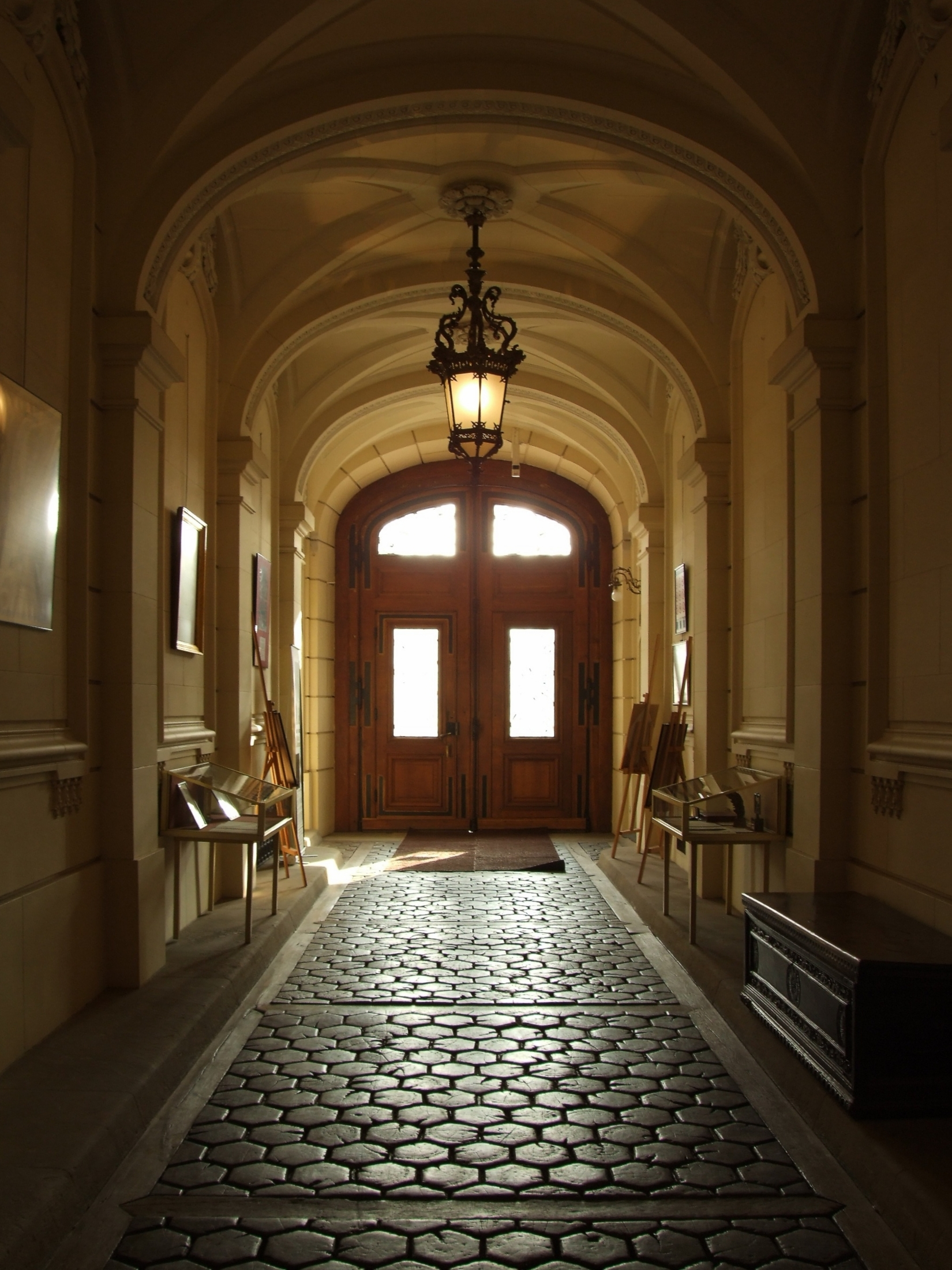
Pszczyna Castle in southwestern Poland

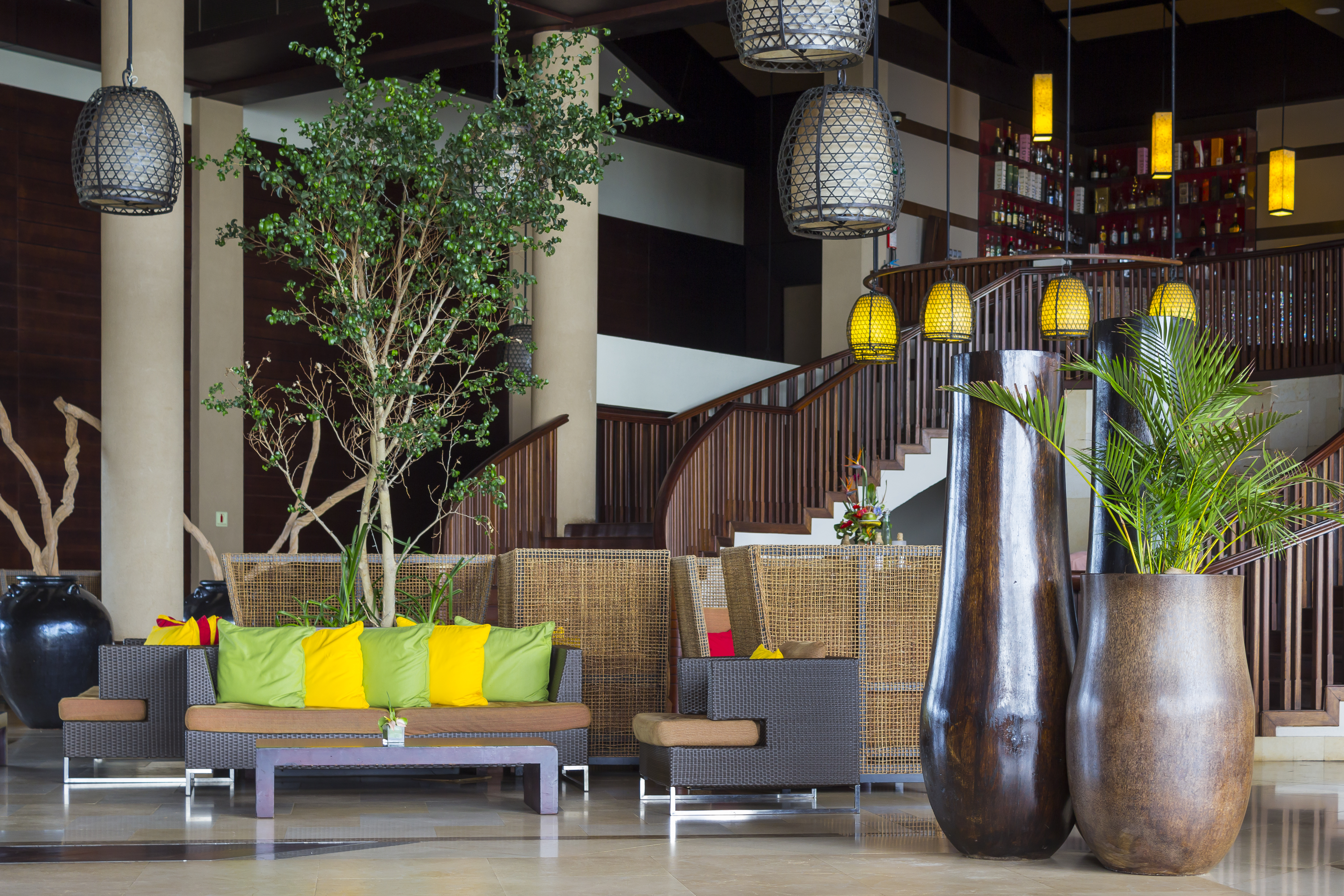
Lobby of the InterContinental Mauritius Resort Balaclava Fort

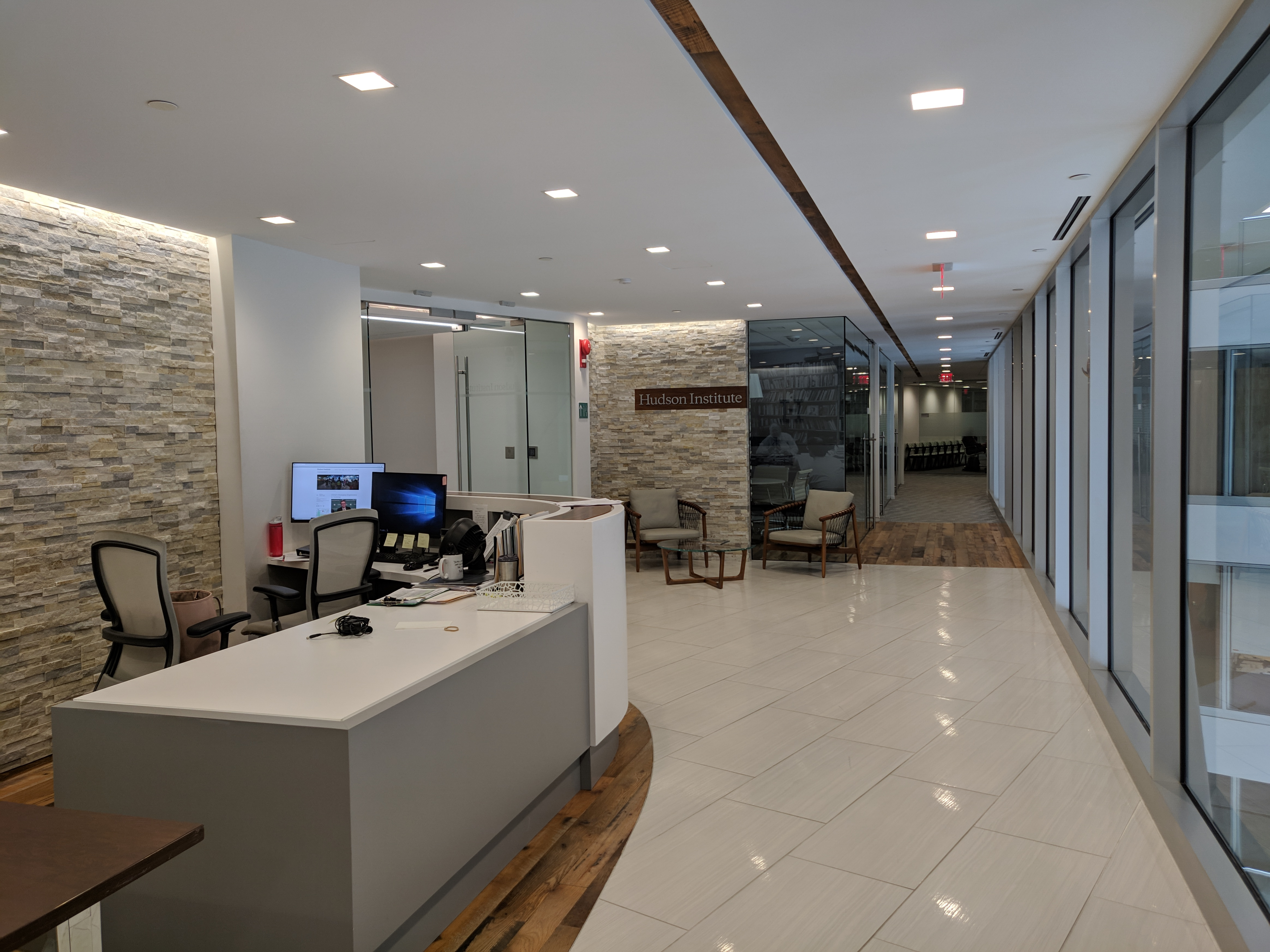
Reception area of the Hudson Institute in Washington, D.C.

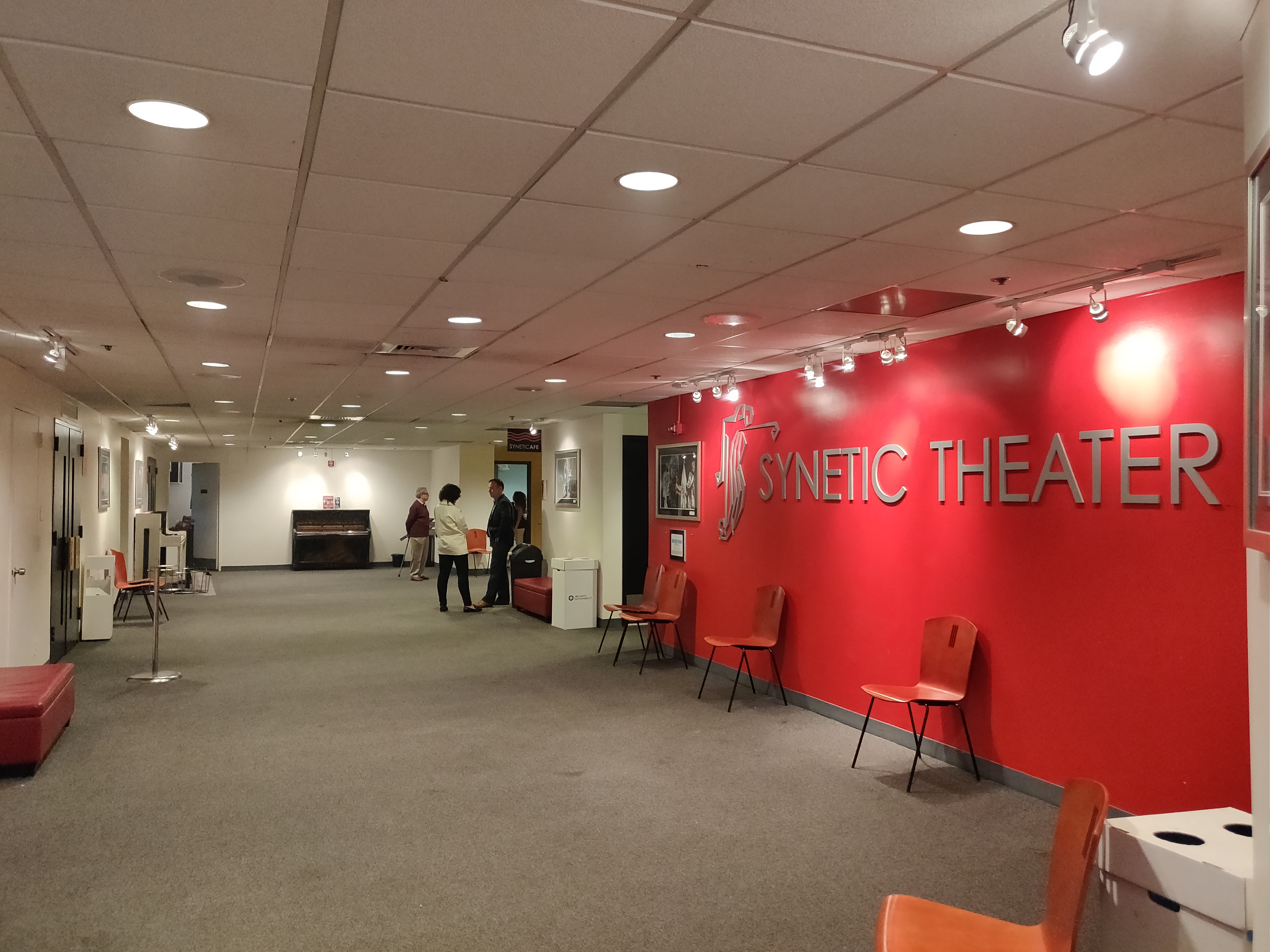
Lobby of Synetic Theater in Crystal City, Virginia

== See also ==
- Atrium (architecture)
- Genkan
- Vestibule (architecture)
