= Fafa's =

Finnish fast food restaurant chain

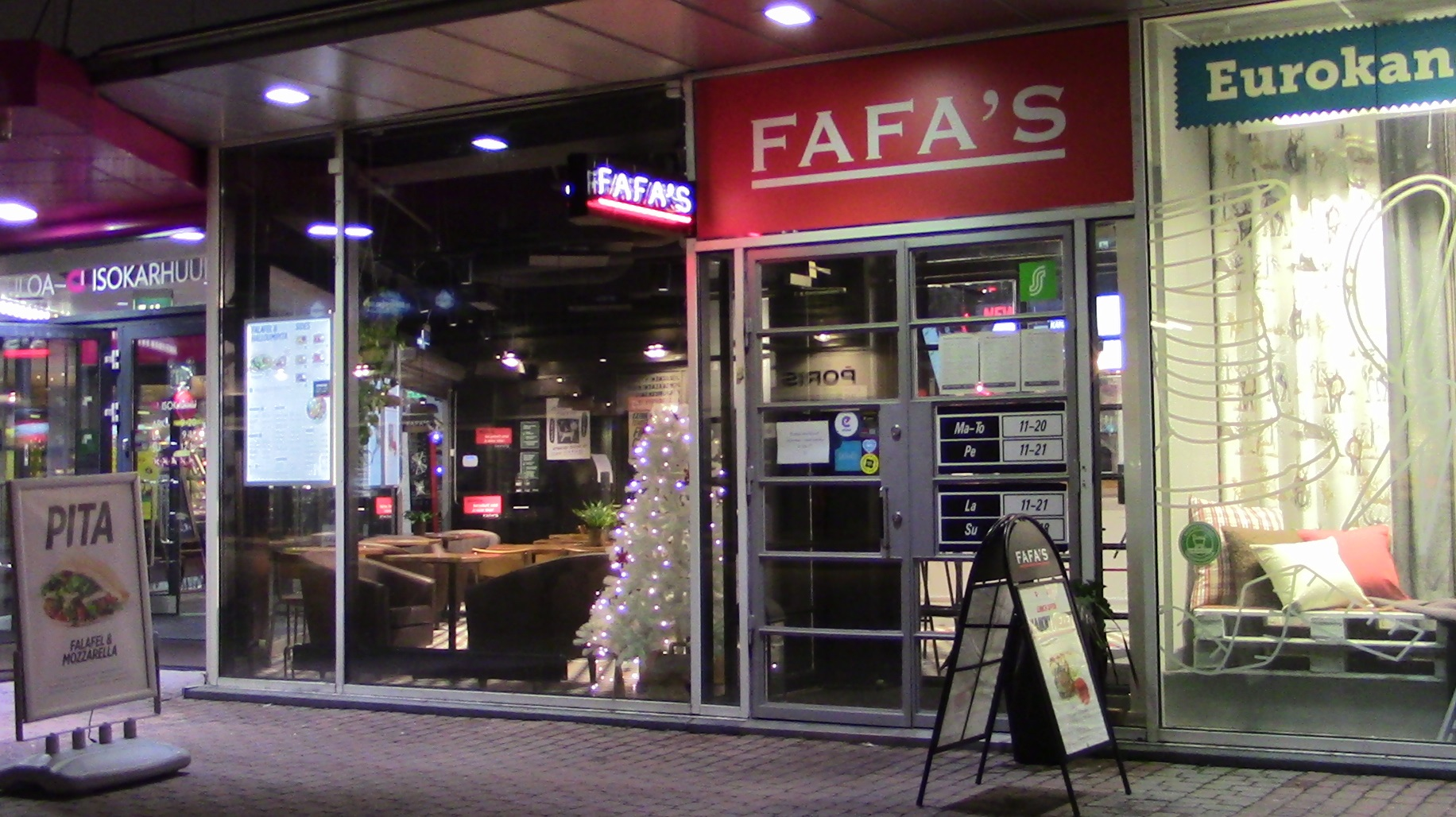
Discontinued Fafa's restaurant at the IsoKarhu shopping centre in Pori.

Fafa's is a Finnish fast food restaurant chain founded in 2011, serving falafel, pita and salads. The chain has 40 restaurants in Finland, two in Sweden and one in Estonia. A London branch in the United Kingdom is no longer open. The Fafa's restaurants work on a franchising principle. Fafa's is the first completely carbon-neutral restaurant chain in Finland.

The first Fafa's restaurant was opened in Punavuori, Helsinki, in December 2011. As well as Helsinki, the chain has restaurants in Espoo, Vantaa, Turku, Seinäjoki, Tampere, Oulu, Lahti, Jyväskylä, Lappeenranta, Oulu, Raisio, Hyvinkää, Tallinn, Stockholm and London.

In Finland, Fafa's is a popular employer for foreign immigrants, as it does not require its employees to speak Finnish. All Fafa's restaurants are completely English-speaking down to the branding and the menu, and only about 10 to 15 percent of Fafa's employees are ethnic Finns.

== Expansion abroad ==
Fafa's has opened restaurants in Tallinn, Stockholm and London. The chain plans on expanding to other Nordic countries in the future as well as elsewhere in Europe. According to the company founder, Israeli-born Doron Karavani, negotiations are under way about restaurants in Denmark and Switzerland. The company plans on having over a hundred restaurants internationally in 2022.
