= List of largest shopping centres in the Nordic countries =

This is a list of the largest shopping centres in the Nordic countries, comprising Finland, Sweden, Norway, Denmark and Iceland. All shopping centres over 50,000 m^{2} are shown.

== List ==
Name	Leasable area (m^{2})	City	Country
Thon Senter Lagunen	150,000	Bergen	(Norway)
Ideapark Lempäälä	133,345	Lempäälä	(Finland)
Jumbo	115,900	Vantaa	(Finland)
Thon Sørlandssenteret	110,500	Kristiansand	(Norway)
Westfield Mall of Scandinavia	101,048	Stockholm	(Sweden)
Rosengårdcentret	100,000	Odense	(Denmark)
Bruuns Galleri	90,000	Aarhus	(Denmark)
Kista Galleria	90,000	Stockholm	(Sweden)
Sello	88,000	Espoo	(Finland)
Mall of Tripla	86,600	Helsinki	(Finland)
Iso Omena	85,200	Espoo	(Finland)
Nordby Shoppingcenter	85,000	Strömstad	(Sweden)
Ideapark Seinäjoki	83,850	Seinäjoki	(Finland)
Field's	78,000	Copenhagen	(Denmark)
Frölunda Torg	75,000	Gothenburg	(Sweden)
Nordstan	70,000	Gothenburg	(Sweden)
Itis	66,803	Helsinki	(Finland)
Smáralind	65,200	Kópavogur	(Iceland)
Thon Senter Strømmen	65,000	Lillestrøm	(Norway)
Emporia	65,000	Malmö	(Sweden)
Mylly	60,253	Raisio	(Finland)
Thon Senter Sandvika	60,000	Sandvika	(Norway)
Redi	58,300	Helsinki	(Finland)
Kringlan	52,000	Reykjavík	(Iceland)
Hansakortteli	50,987	Turku	(Finland)

== See also ==
- List of tallest buildings in Scandinavia
- List of stadiums in the Nordic countries by capacity
