= Toivo Sukari =

Finnish businessman (born 1954)

- Born: Toivo Ilmo Kalevi Sukari; 8 April 1954 (age 72); Mynämäki, Finland
- Other name: Topi Sukari
- Occupation: Businessman
- Spouse(s): Eeva Sukari (m. 1977; div. 2009) Nadja Eerola (m. 2019)
- Children: 5

Toivo "Topi" Ilmo Kalevi Sukari (born April 8, 1954) is a Finnish businessman. Born in Mynämäki, he is the founder and largest shareholder of Maskun Kalustetalo and Ideapark. Sukari also owns the shopping mall chain stores Masku Koti and Sukarin Lomarakennus. He comes from a Laestadian family, and he has seven siblings. His father was a small-time farmer and entrepreneur. Sukari has five children with his ex-wife Eeva. In 2019, he married Kazakhstani fitness competitor Nadja Eerola. As of 2026, they live in the Costa del Sol, Spain.
