= Entresse =

Shopping center in Espoo, Finland

Coordinates: 60°12′13.22″N 24°39′31″E

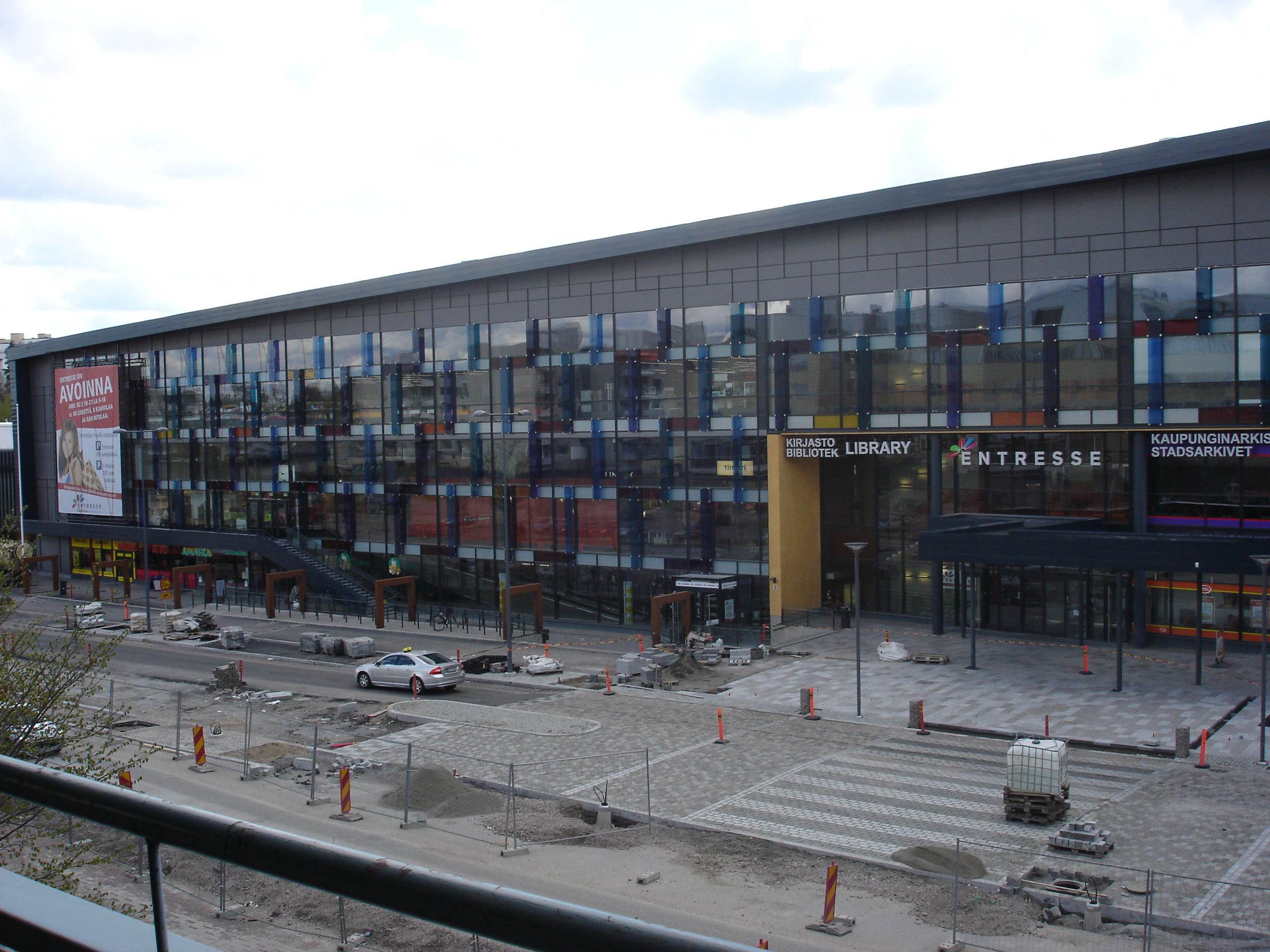
Entresse.

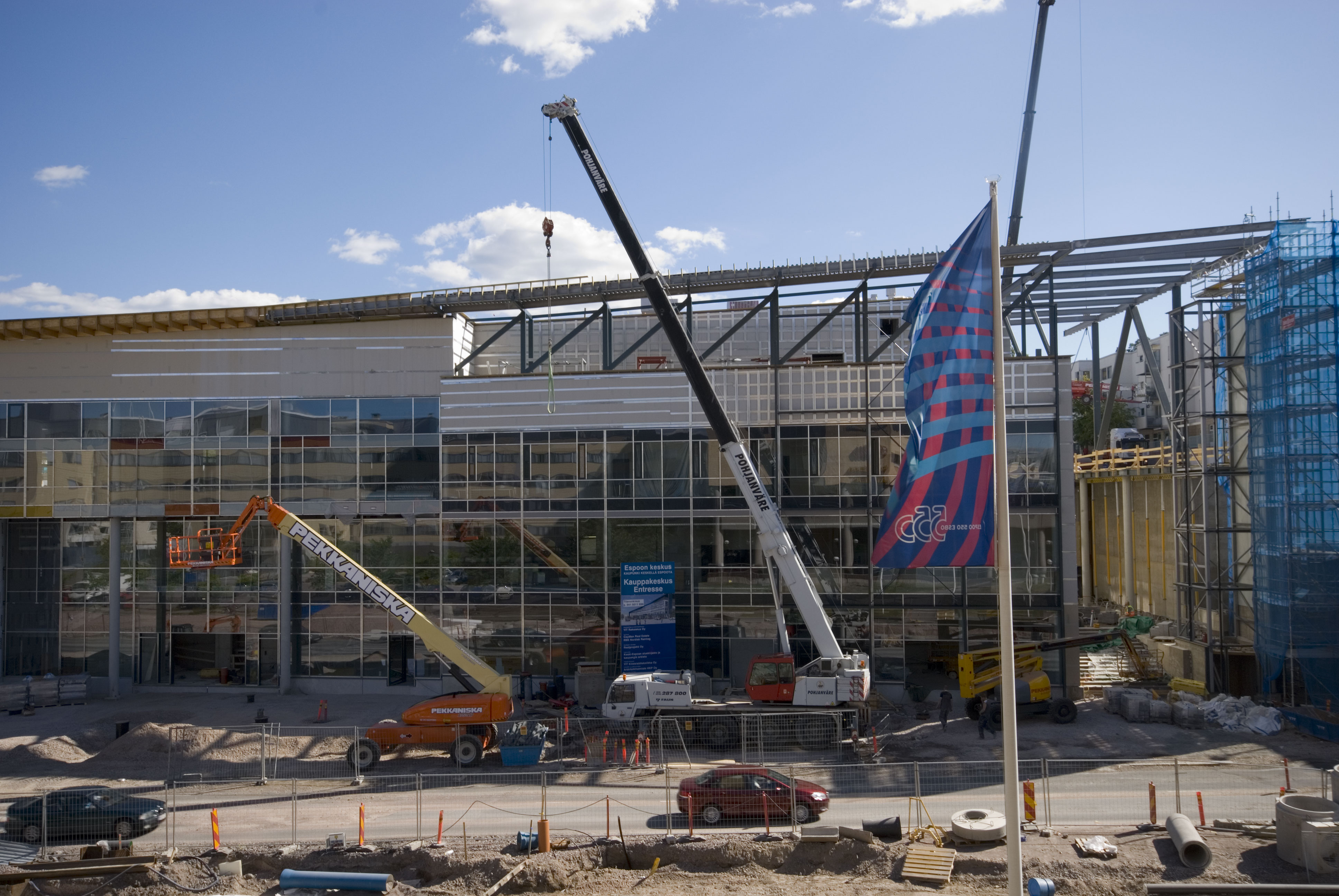
Entresse under construction.

Entresse is a shopping mall in Espoon keskus, Espoo, Finland. The shopping center opened on November 25, 2008. It is located opposite the older shopping center Espoontori.

Entresse has 32 stores and 17,000 square meters of leasable retail space. In the spring of 2009, a new regional library, the Entresse library, was opened in the shopping center, and the Espoo city archives relocated to Entresse. Until 2026, an S-market supermarket operated in connection with the shopping mall, accessible via a covered pedestrian bridge. A new Prisma hypermarket is currently being built on the site of the former S-market, with completion scheduled for 2028.

== History ==
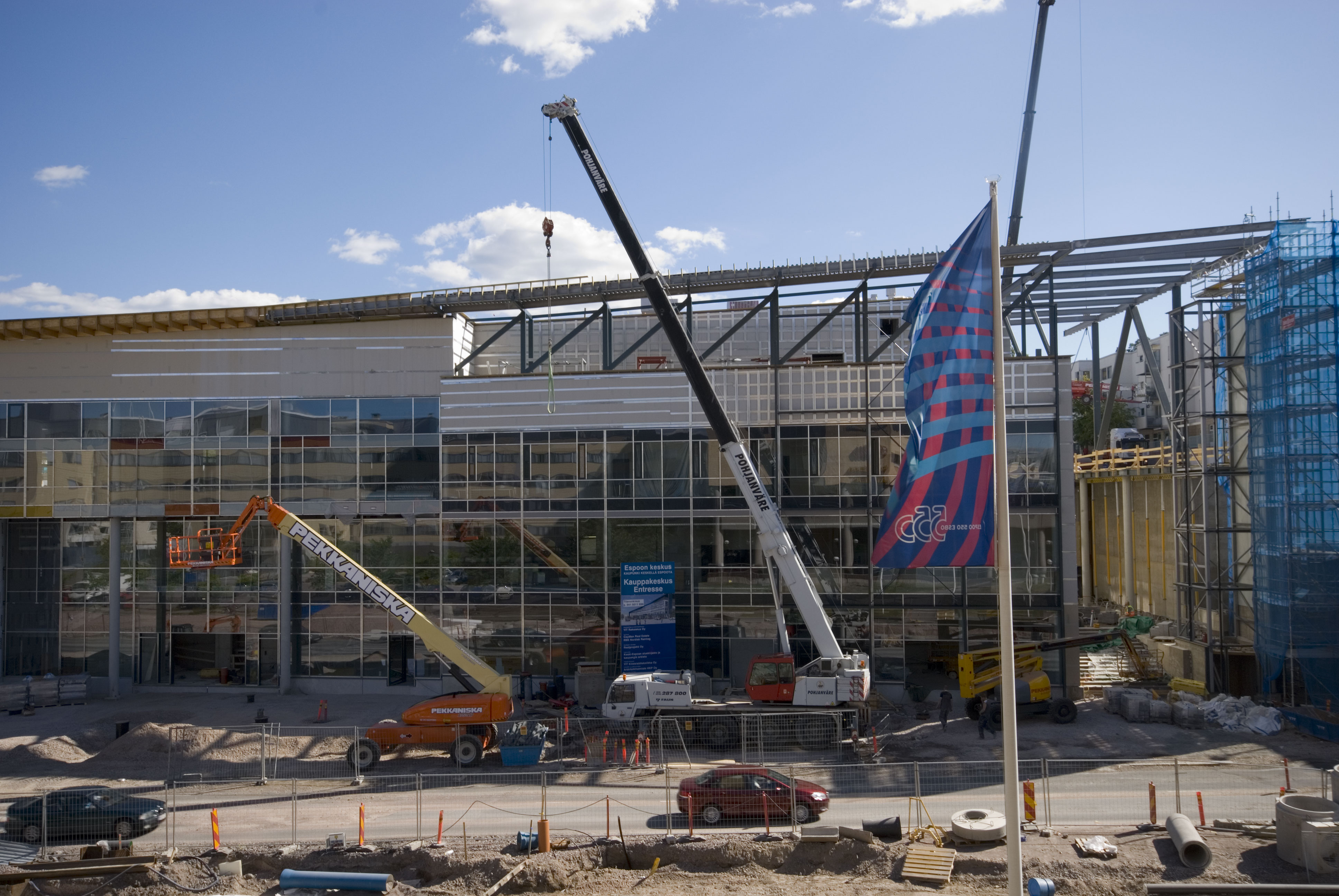
The mall under construction.

The S-market that operated as part of Entresse from 2008 to 2026 was originally a Eurospar store belonging to the Suomen Spar chain. This store, which was the largest Spar store in Finland by floor area, opened on April 20, 1999. The Eurospar in Espoon keskus was converted into an S-market in 2006 after the central corporation of the S Group acquired the share capital of Suomen Spar.

The Entresse shopping center opened on November 25, 2008. At the same time, the S-market was connected to the shopping mall via a covered pedestrian bridge. Several chain stores opened in the mall, including Clas Ohlson, Rolls, Pentik, Makuuni and Sinelli. In 2013, an H&M store opened in the shopping center, and in 2018, a Lidl was opened in place of Clas Ohlson. The Helinä Rautavaara Museum moved to the shopping center in 2019. In 2024, a Tokmanni store opened in the former H&M location.

The building of the Entresse S-market was demolished in early 2026. A new Prisma center is currently being built in its place, scheduled for completion in 2028.

== Transport connections ==
The shopping center is served by the Helsinki commuter rail lines E, L, U, and Y at the nearby Espoo railway station. It is also accessible by regional bus lines from various neighborhoods, including Tapiola, Matinkylä, Espoonlahti, Kauklahti, Leppävaara, Myyrmäki, and the Helsinki city centre.
