= Torikeskus (Jyväskylä shopping centre) =

Shopping centre in Finland

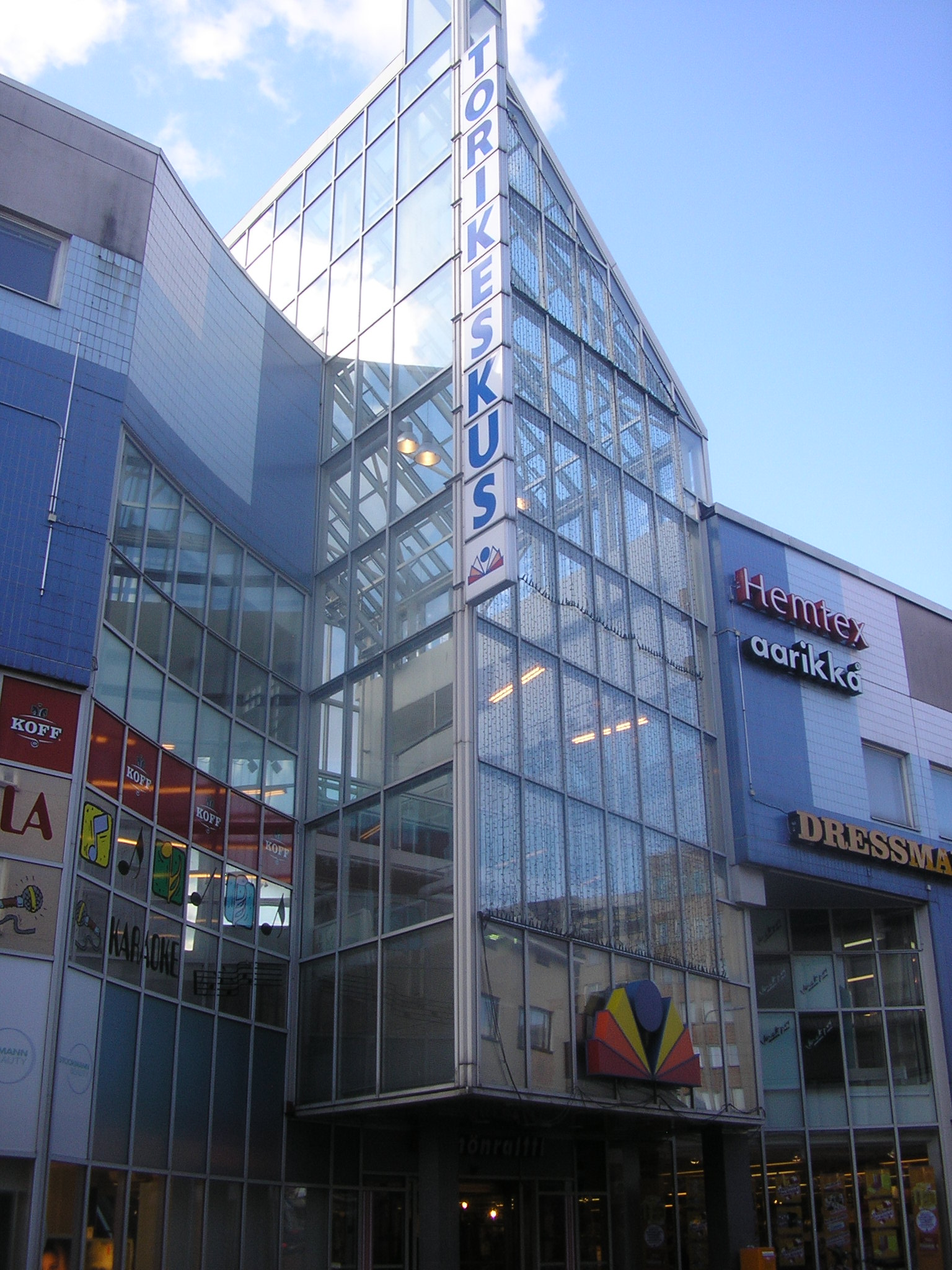
Torikeskus seen from Väinönkatu.

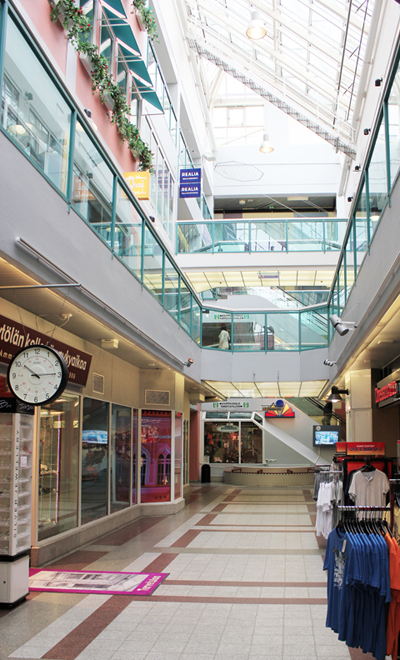
Interior of Torikeskus.

Torikeskus is a shopping centre in the centre of Jyväskylä, Finland. The stores in Torikeskus are mainly concentrated on beauty care, healthcare and fashion, and the shopping centre also includes numerous restaurants. There are about forty different business in total in the shopping centre.

Torikeskus was built in 1988, and it is located in the block surrounded by the streets Väinönkatu, Kauppakatu and Yliopistokatu. The same block includes the shopping centre Tawast and Hoviraitti. The other shopping centres of Jyväskylä - Forum, Jyväskeskus and Sokos are located around Torikeskus. The shopping centres form the centre of Jyväskylä and the Kompassiaukio environment.
