= Helinä Rautavaara =

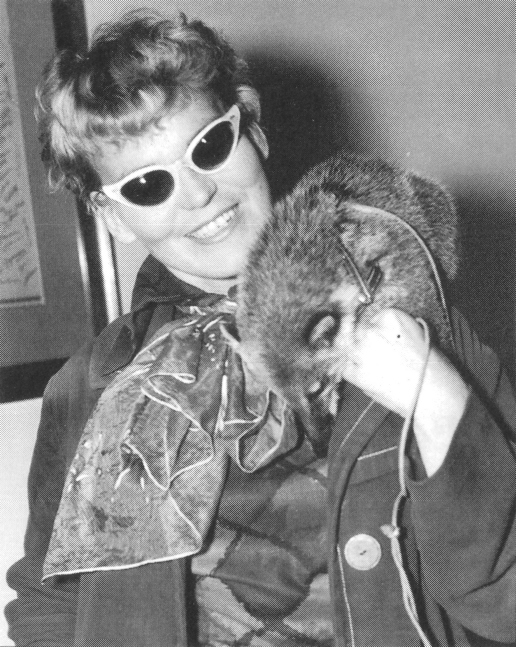

Helinä Rautavaara (24 March 1929 Helsinki, Finland - 27 February 1998 Helsinki) was a Finnish explorer, adventurer, collector and journalist. She traveled in Africa, Asia and Latin America and collected ethnographic artefacts and information about cultures. Her collection is now displayed in The Helinä Rautavaara Museum in Espoo.

Helinä Rautavaara was a daughter of professor of botany Toivo Rautavaara. She studied psychology, graduated but never executed the profession. She wanted to travel "as far as possible" and wrote about her travels to Finnish magazines. Her first trip was to Northern Africa. The second trip to Iraq, Iran, Afghanistan, India, Nepal and Ceylon lasted two years. She became interested in religions, and started to record what she saw in photographs, audiotapes and films. Later she also collected items related to rituals.

She returned to studies twice: 1958–1959 in University of Michigan, Ann Arbor, and 1972 in Helsinki University studying research of religions. She was collecting material for a doctoral thesis, but she never wrote the thesis.

== Helinä Rautavaara Museum ==
By 1980s Rautavaara had such a large collection, that she opened her own museum. In 1997 a Foundation was formed with Espoo City, and the collections were placed in WeeGee house exhibition centre. The Helinä Rautavaara Museum is the most visited ethnographic museum in Finland.
