= Ratina (shopping centre) =

Ratina Shopping Center
- Kauppakeskus Ratina
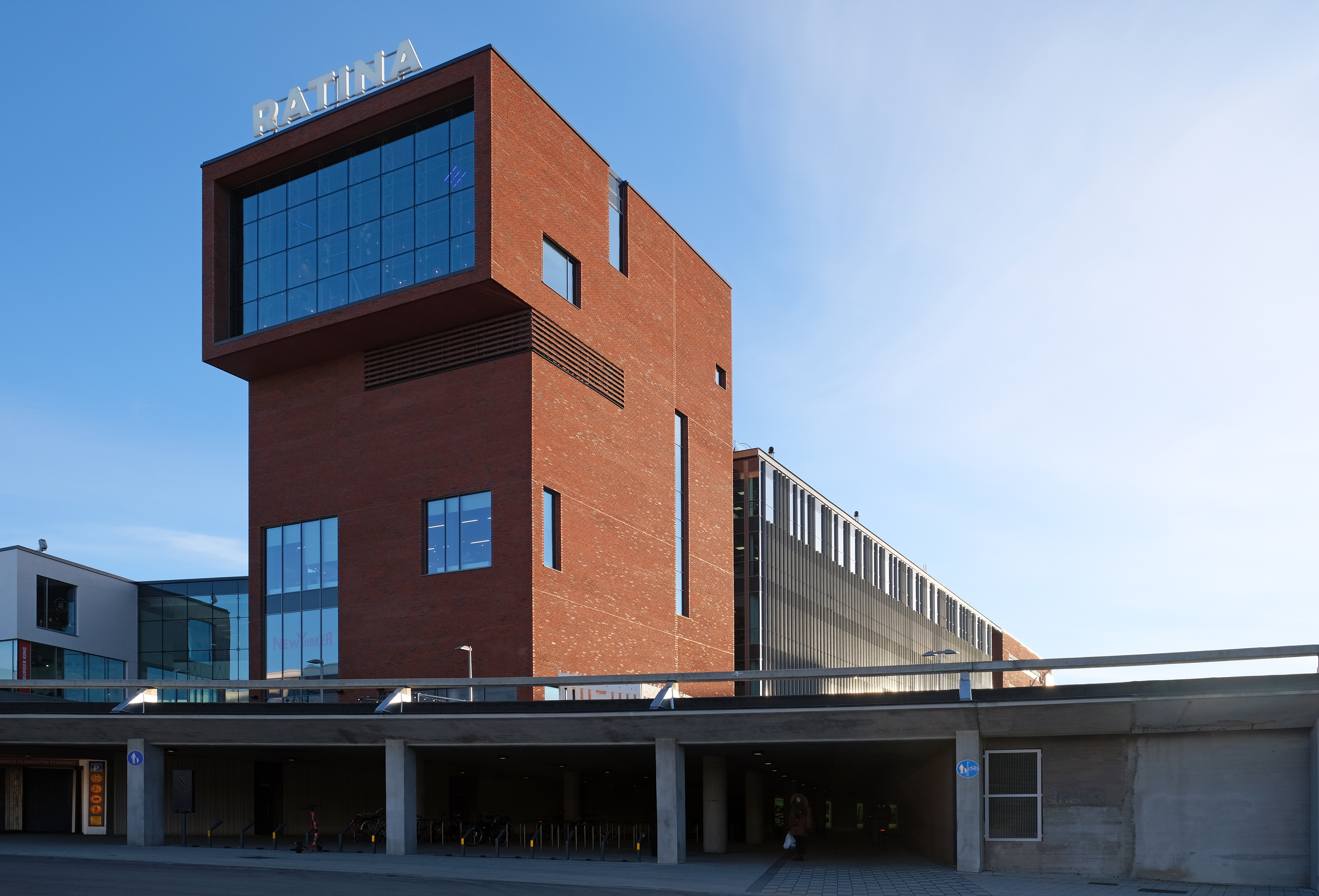
- Exterior of Ratina in 2021
- Location: Ratina, Tampere, Finland
- Coordinates: 61°29′34.69409″N 23°46′02.61347″E
- Address: Vuolteenkatu 1
- Opened: April 19, 2018
- Owner: Sponda Oyj
- Architect: Jussi Murole (Arkkitehtuuritoimisto B&M Oy); Tuomo Siitonen (Arkkitehtitoimisto Tuomo Siitonen Oy)
- Num. of stores: over 140
- Num. of anchor tenants: 7
- Floor area: 53,800 m²
- Floors: 7 (+2 parking floors)
- Parking: over 1,200
- Website: www.ratina.fi/en/

Ratina (Finnish: Kauppakeskus Ratina) is a shopping center in Finland, opened in the heart of Tampere on 19 April 2018, whose construction began in April 2015. Ratina is Tampere's largest shopping center with 53,000 square meters of retail space, offering groceries, fashion, interior design, wellness and leisure services, as well as cafés and restaurants. Under it, a parking space for more than 1,200 cars has been built, which is the largest parking garage in the center of Tampere.

== Location, features and facilities ==
Corridor at Ratina's second floor.

The Ratina shopping center is built between Ratina Stadium and the Tampere Bus Station, and there is also an underground connection to the bus station below the Vuolteenkatu street. The new building in the shopping center is largely located on the former pier area of the bus station. The shopping center is also accessible directly from the bus station via escalators. The developer is Sponda, which was selected as the contractor by the City Board in April 2006. The consortium of Citycon Oyj and Skanska, YIT and NCC also submitted their bids.

The Ratina shopping center is the largest real estate development project in Sponda's history, with a total investment of approximately EUR 250 million. The mall has a total of more than 140 stores and consists of three separate buildings; a new building from Ratina and two restored function buildings, Ranta-Ratina and Ratinan Kulma. The latter of these opened in June 2018. Ratinan Kulma is located on the premises of the former Vuoltsu, while Ranta-Ratina is located in the Autotuonti property.

== Planning and construction ==
Construction of the shopping center was originally scheduled to begin in early 2009. However, the shopping center did not receive a building permit until October 2009, and according to the January 2010 announcement, construction work could have begun in spring 2010 at the earliest, depending on the main tenants. In the spring of 2015, Sponda made an investment decision on the construction and construction work began in April 2015. In its investment decision, Sponda said that the shopping center would be completed in the spring of 2018.

An agreement on the implementation and sale of the plot of land between the City of Tampere and Sponda was signed in May 2008. The purchase price of the 24,000-square-meter plot was EUR 20,407,000, which is the largest plot of land of the City of Tampere ever. In addition, Sponda bought the Autotuonti property next to the Ratina shopping center site and later the city block of Vuoltsu from the city. Car imports were expanded and connected to the shopping center by extending the shopping centre's lowest store level to Autotuonti. The Vuoltsu block was also connected to the shopping center.

== See also ==
- Koskikeskus (shopping centre)
- Tullintori
