= Tullintori =

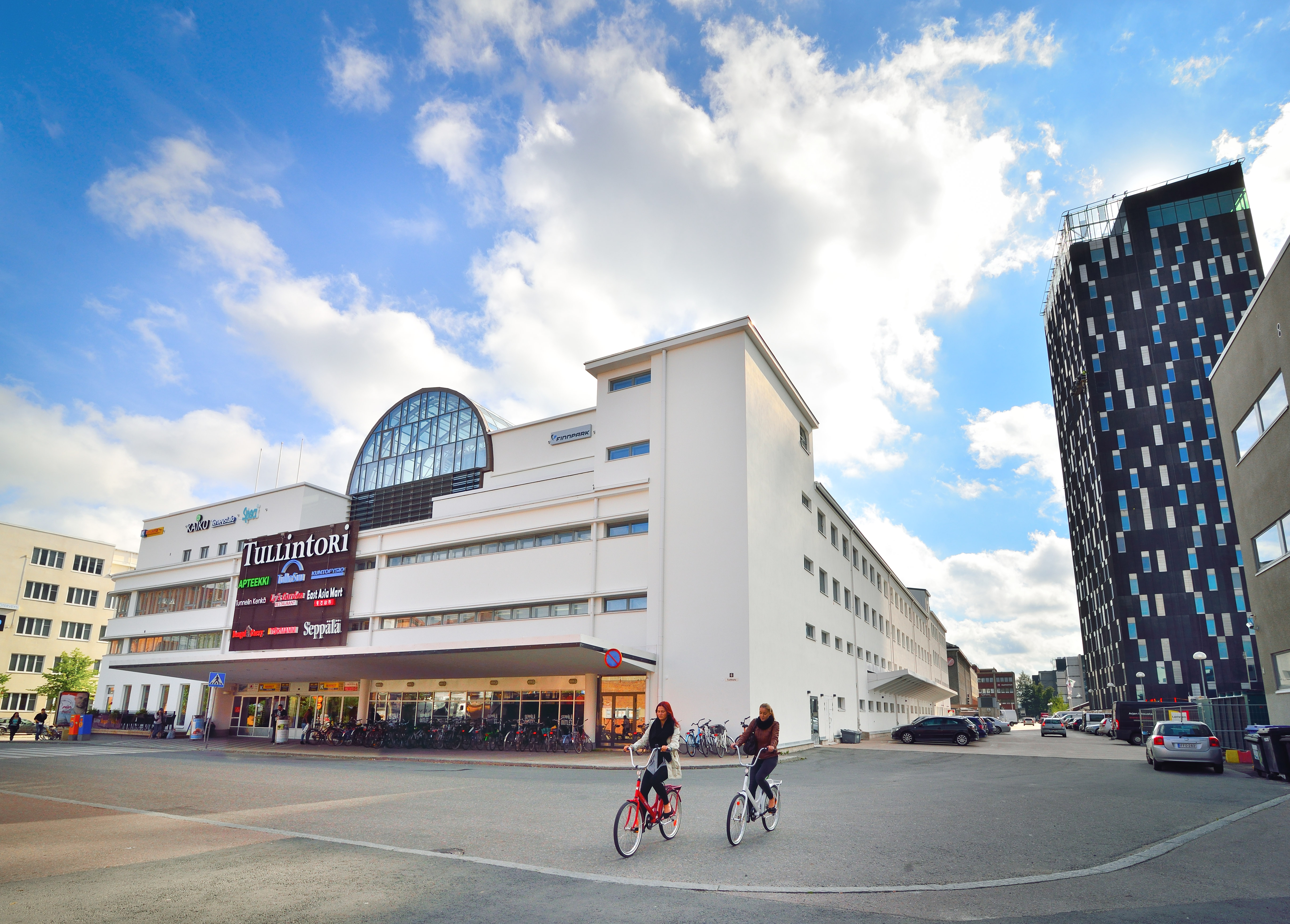
- Exterior of Tullintori in 2014
- Location: Tulli, Tampere, Finland
- Coordinates: 61°29′52″N 23°46′37″E
- Address: Tullikatu 6
- Opened: 1930; 1990 (as shopping center)
- Owner: Keskinäinen; Työeläkevakuutusyhtiö Elo
- Num. of stores: 46
- Num. of anchor tenants: 4
- Floor area: 23,800 m²
- Floors: 5
- Website: tullintori.fi/in-english/

Tullintori is a shopping center located in Tulli, Tampere, Finland. The largest of the two owners of the shopping center is Elo Mutual Pension Insurance Company, who own 97%. The shopping center contains around 50 shops and numerous cafés and restaurants and a recreational climbing area. The top floors are mainly office space. The annual number of visitors to the center is about 2,5 million. Architecturally, Tullintori is a traditional arcade, glass-covered “colonnade”. It was formed by combining SOK's functionalist building, completed in 1930, with a new extension. The Tullintori shopping center was completed in 1990.

Tullintori is located right next to Tampere Central Station. Parking lots can be found on P-Tullintori and on the deck of Tullintori. The shopping center has access to Hotel Torni and Sokos Hotel Villa.

== See also ==
- Koskikeskus (shopping centre)
- Ratina (shopping centre)
