= Koskikeskus (shopping centre) =

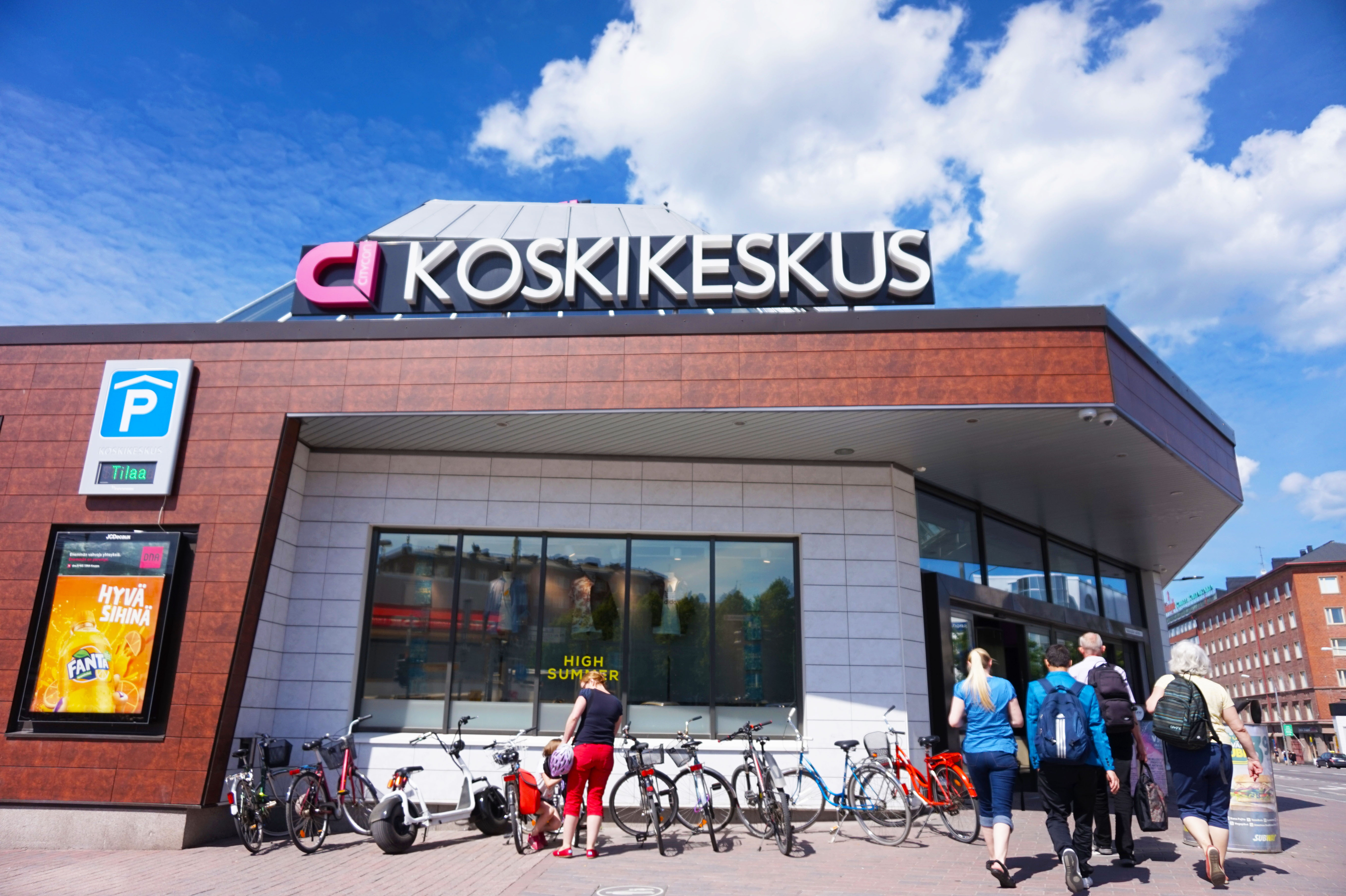
- Entrance of Koskikeskus in 2017
- Location: Kyttälä, Tampere, Finland
- Coordinates: 61°29.75′N 23°46.05′E
- Address: Hatanpään valtatie 1
- Opened: March 22, 1988
- Owner: Citycon Oyj
- Architect: Antti Tähtinen
- Num. of stores: 89
- Num. of anchor tenants: 7
- Floor area: 33,100 m²
- Floors: 5
- Parking: 430
- Website: www.koskikeskus.fi

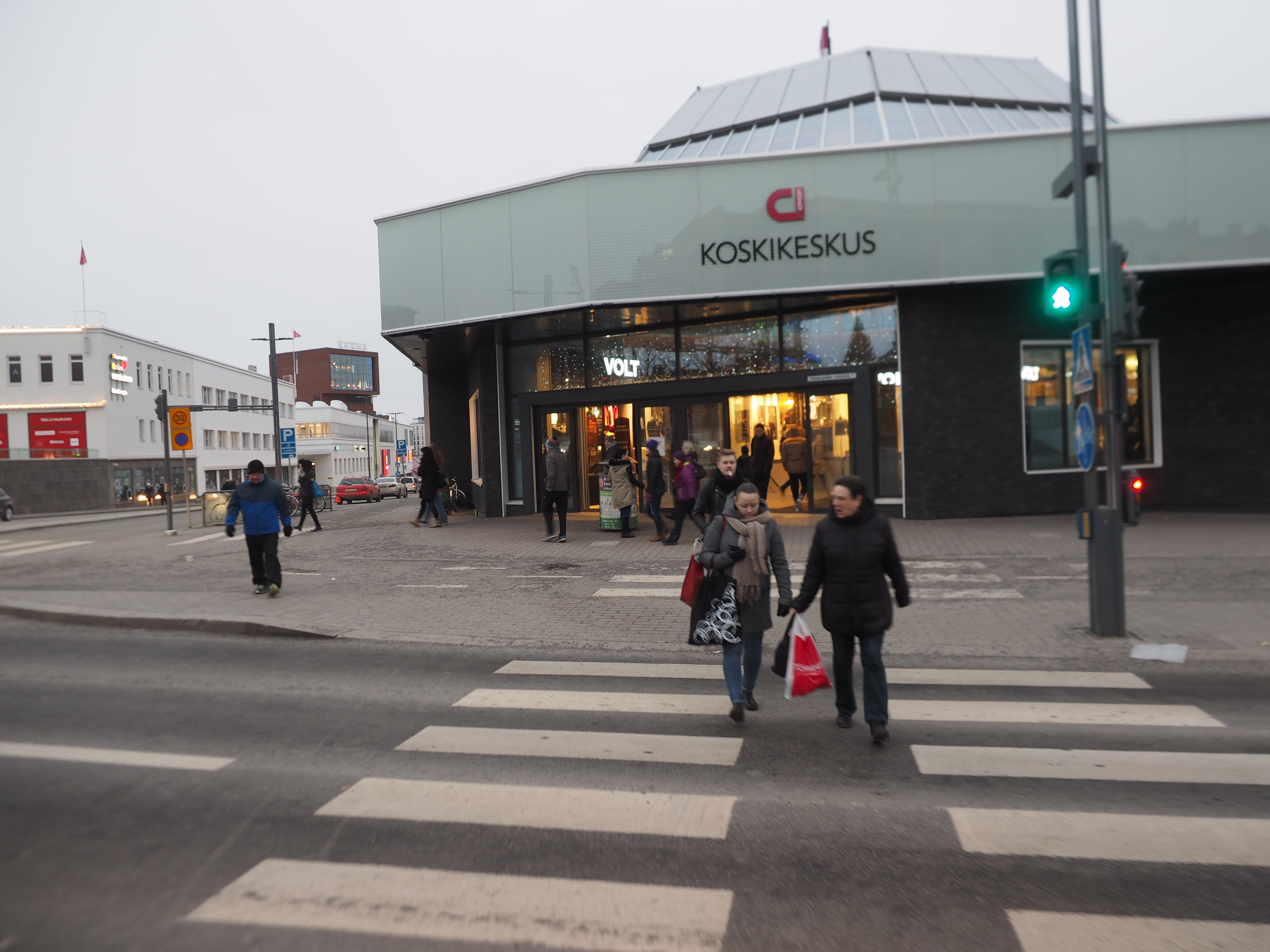
Entrance to Koskikeskus in December 2018.

Koskikeskus is a shopping center in Kyttälä, Tampere, Finland, next to Sokos Hotel Ilves. It was opened in March 1988, when it was the largest shopping center in Finland at the time. The shopping center and the adjacent Hotel Ilves were built on the site of the old Verkatehdas.

== History ==
In the early years, the center, built by Polar-Yhtymä construction company, had interior waterfalls and customers could play tennis on two outdoor courts built on the roof during the summer. There were about a hundred shops in the center. The architecture included various alleys on the third floor. Since then, Pyörrekuja and other detours provided space for new business premises.

In 2003, Citycon Oyj acquired Koskikeskus from the Polar-Yhtymä company. Koskikeskus was partially renovated in 2005–2006, and a more comprehensive renovation began in spring 2011 and was completed in November 2012. In connection with the renovation, all retail premises, facades, entrances and the cooling system owned by Citycon were renovated. The new cooling system gets its energy from the adjacent Tammerkoski. All shops were open during the renovation. Citycon is investing about EUR 38 million in the renovation.

In 2018, Finland's largest LED display was built on the roof of Koskikeskus. The octagonal "crown" has an area of 144 square meters and weighs 2,390 kilograms. In May 2019, Koskikeskus invited teenagers who were in the mall a lot to come up with common rules for a workshop organized by the Nuorten Palvelut youth service. The rules are available for everyone to see in the mall's information kiosks.

== Services ==
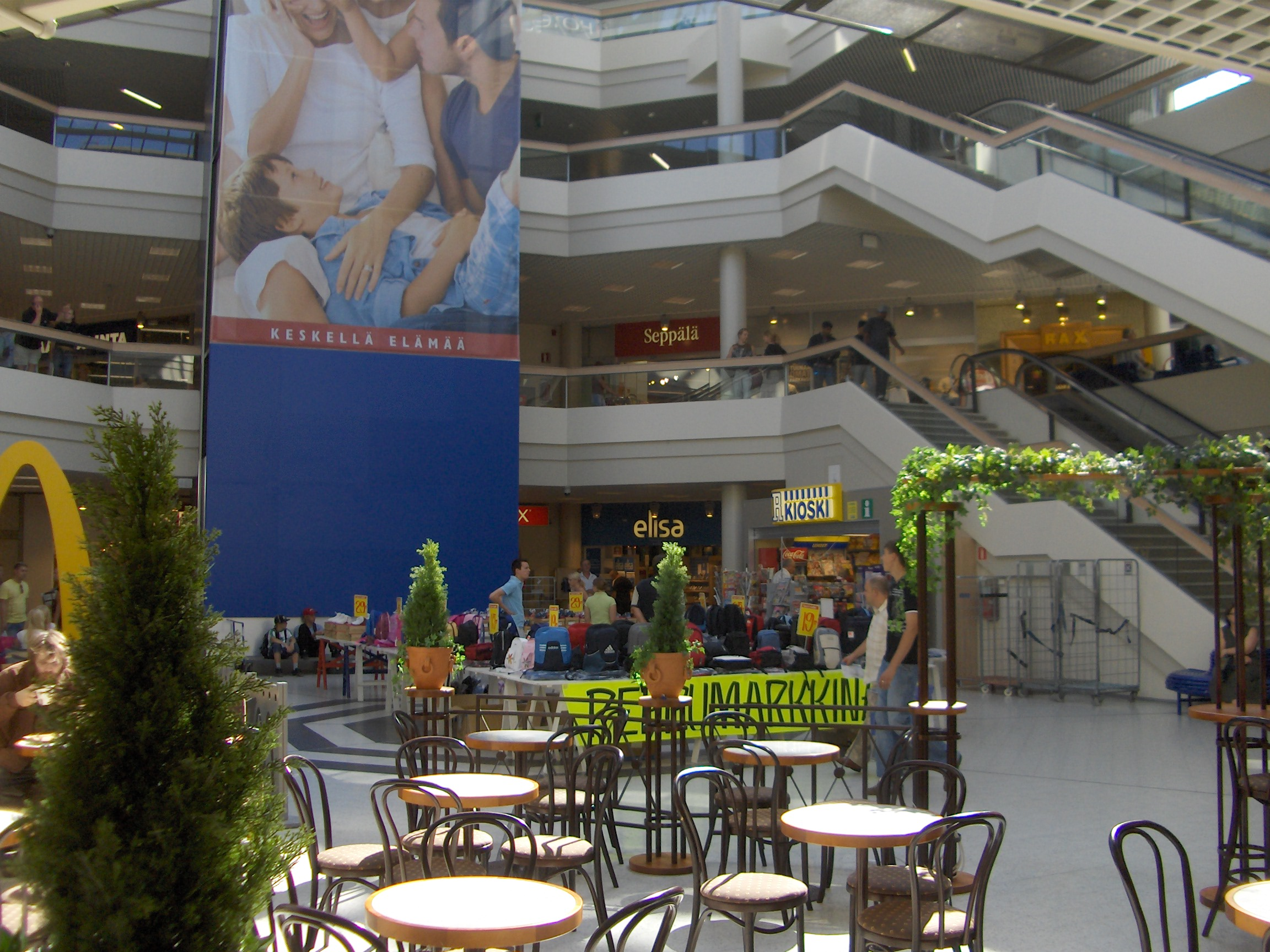
Interior of Koskikeskus

Koskikeskus has almost a hundred shops on four above-ground floors and on the ground floors. The fourth floor is mainly for health services. Koskikeskus also has an extensive parking garage. On the ground floor is the Finnkino's movie theatre Cine Atlas. Koskikeskus has a rich restaurant offer. Koskikeskus has 89 stores in various fields;

- 15 restaurant and cafe shops, including Arnolds and Taco Bell
- 12 beauty and health specialty stores, such as The Body Shop
- 7 home improvement and interior design stores, such as Pentik
- 31 fashion and clothing stores, such as Kookenkä, Dressmann and Lindex
- 3 grocery stores: Tokmanni, M-Market and R-kioski
- 8 leisure and sports shops, such as Stadium and Intersport
- 8 other specialty shops

== See also ==
- Ratina (shopping centre)
- Tullintori
