= Veska (shopping mall) =

Shopping mall in Pirkkala, Finland

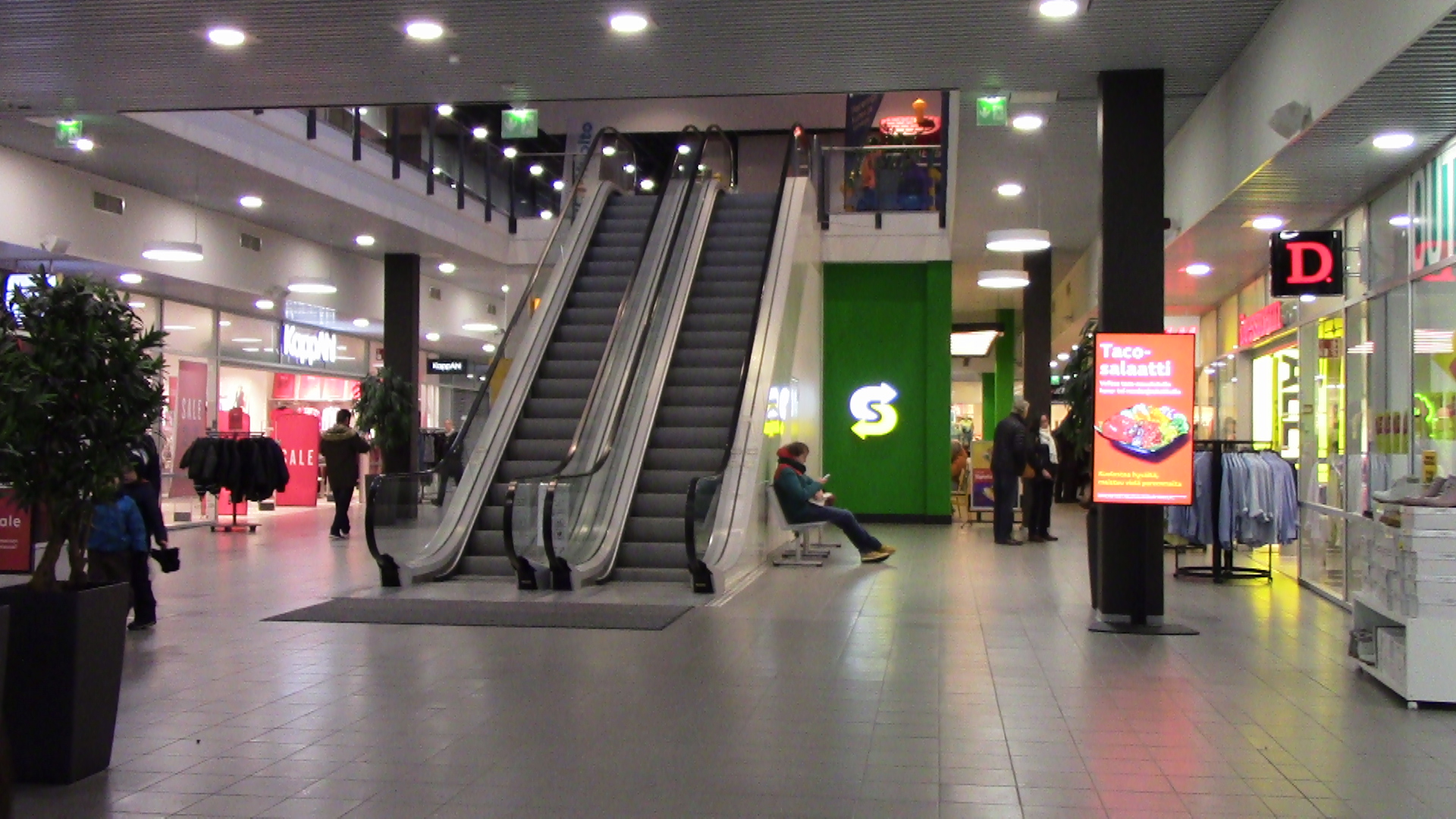
Interior of Veska shopping mall in January 2019.

Veska is a shopping mall in the Partola district of Pirkkala, Finland. Its original part was completed in 2003 and the expansion part in early 2017. After the construction of the expansion part the mall was renovated, which was completed in November 2018. Veska has two floors and over 30 stores. A hotel named Veska Hotelli has also been planned in connection to the mall, whose construction would begin in 2020 at the earliest.

== Shops and services ==
=== Household items and hardware ===
- Iittala
- Isku
- Jysk
- Kvik
- Thread shop Villa Pallo

=== Pet supplies ===
- Peten Koiratarvike

=== Exercise and wellness ===
- Fysiotoma
- HDC Finland
- HopLop
- Hyve
- Voactum
- Jersey53
- MyFascia

=== Clothing and sports ===
- Click Shoes
- Dressmann
- H&M
- Jack&Jones
- KappAhl
- Ripsi- ja kynsistudio B
- Vero Moda

=== Restaurants ===
- Burger King
- Fire Wok
- Itsudemo
- Ninan keittiö
- Subway
- Ståhlberg Kahvila

=== Other services ===
- Kapsäkki
- Municipality of Pirkkala
