= IsoKarhu =

IsoKarhu Shopping Center
- Kauppakeskus IsoKarhu
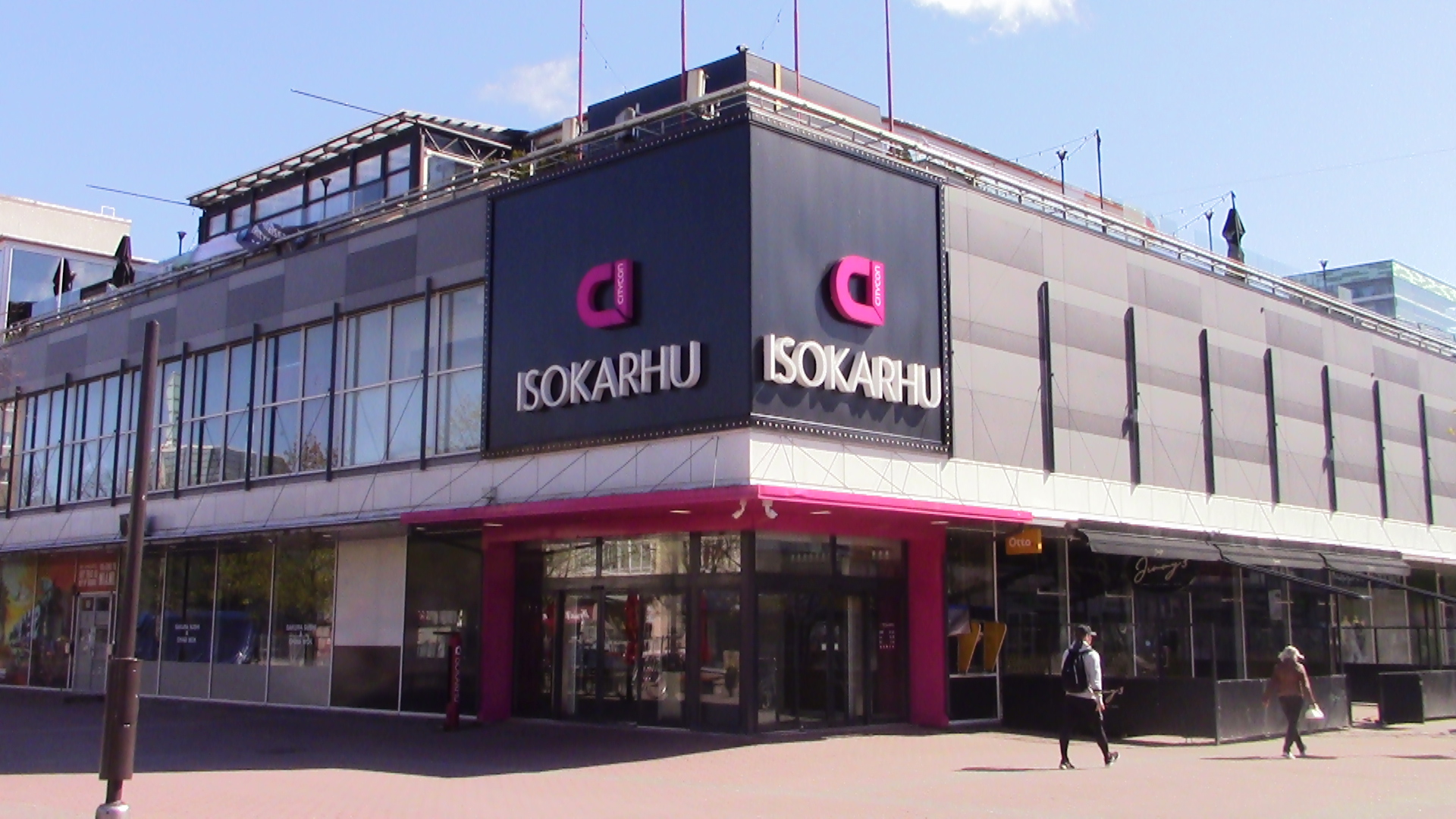
- Exterior of IsoKarhu in 2020
- Location: Pori, Finland
- Coordinates: 61°29′04.063″N 21°47′52.728″E
- Address: Yrjönkatu 14
- Opened: 1991
- Owner: Citycon Oyj
- Architect: Jouko Ylihannu & Osmo Solansuu
- Num. of stores: 34
- Num. of anchor tenants: 5
- Floor area: 14,700 m²
- Floors: 3
- Parking: 220
- Website: www.isokarhu.fi

IsoKarhu (literally translated "BigBear") is a shopping center owned by Citycon, which was opened in 1991. It is located in the city center of Pori, Finland, along the Yrjönkatu pedestrian street between Karhunpää, Linna and Itätulli districts.

The oldest part of IsoKarhu was renovated in 1991 into a property where the Centrum department store, originally owned by Osuusliike Kansa, operated. The department store property, completed in 1973, was designed by Jouko Ylihannu, an architect of Osuustukkukauppa (OTK). In 2001–2004, IsoKarhu expanded to cover the entire block. Initially, the shopping center building in Pori, completed in 1978 and designed by architect Osmo Solansuu, was renovated for the use of the shopping center. The extension was introduced in October 2001.

In 2004, the last extension to the corner estate of the Liisankatu and Isolinnankatu streets was built. At the same time, a driveway and footbridge connecting the parking lot of IsoKarhu and the Sokos department store in the adjacent block was completed. In the summer of 2017, Citycon said that it will open Finland's third Irti Maasta climbing and adventure park in IsoKarhu next winter.

In November 2018, Citycon said it was planning to have business premises on the street level of Isokarhu, but other floors could include apartments or hotel space, for example. On the other hand, there could even be high-rise buildings on top of the IsoKarhu parking lot in the future. In 2018, the mall had more than 40 specialty stores, the most significant of which were: KappAhl, Gina Tricot and Burger King.
