= Mönkkönen =

Mönkkönen is a Finnish surname. Notable people with the surname include:

- Eric Henry Monkkonen (1942–2005), American historian
- Jukka Mönkkönen (born 1959), Finnish pharmacist
