= Savonia University of Applied Sciences =

Institute of higher education in North Savo, Finland

Coordinates: 62°53′32″N 27°37′52″E

- Savonia-ammattikorkeakoulu
- Motto: Thousands of Possibilities
- Type: Public ammattikorkeakoulu
- Established: Provisional 1992 (perm. 1998)
- Endowment: Approx. $100 million (real estate)
- Rector: Mervi Vidgrén
- Administrative staff: 600
- Students: 4,500 in Kuopio, 1,000 in Varkaus and 1,000 in Iisalmi (total 6,500)
- Undergraduates: 6,400
- Postgraduates: 100 (early adoption stage)
- Location: Kuopio, Varkaus and Iisalmi, North Savo, Finland
- Campus: De-centralized in Kuopio, centralized in Varkaus and Iisalmi (all urban)
- Website: www.savonia.fi

Savonia University of Applied Sciences (Savonia UAS) (Finnish: Savonia-ammattikorkeakoulu) is a local municipality-owned Finnish institution of higher education based in the cities of Kuopio, Iisalmi and Varkaus.

Savonia offers bachelor's and master's degree programmes. It is the sixth largest University of Applied Sciences in Finland with about 6,500 students.

The largest field of education is engineering. Engineers graduate after a minimum of four years and 240 ECTS credits after which they are awarded with the degree of Insinööri (AMK), equivalent to a Bachelor of Engineering (BEng). The second largest field is business, which educates its students for a minimum of three years and 210 ECTS credits. Business studies lead to the degree of Tradenomi, equivalent to Bachelor of Business Administration.

Savonia University of Applied Sciences is participating in the Bologna Process.

The new provisional institution was combined from very old (by Finnish standards) local establishments:

- Kuopio Academy of Design (Kuopion Muotoiluakatemia), est. 1884
- Kuopio Polytechnic (Kuopion Teknillinen oppilaitos), est. 1886
- Kuopio Institute of Commerce (Kuopion kauppaoppilaitos), est. 1887
- Walter Ahlström's Polytechnic (Walter Ahlströmin Teknillinen oppilaitos) in Varkaus
- Varkaus Institute of Commerce (Varkauden kauppaoppilaitos)

Soon they were followed by Kuopio School of Public Health (Kuopion terveydenhuolto-oppilaitos, est. 1896) and the institution expanded also to Iisalmi.

In 1998 it received permanent status by the Finnish Government. 1. January 2004 Pohjois-Savo Polytechnic was renamed to Savonia University of Applied Sciences (Savonia-ammattikorkeakoulu).

== Academics ==
Savonia offers 30 degree programs in 6 fields of study. Courses in the Culture area are taught at the Kuopio Academy of Design and the Kuopio Academy of Music and Dance. Among the Bachelor of Engineering degrees offered is the Fire Officer Training Program, which is in cooperation with the Emergency Services College.

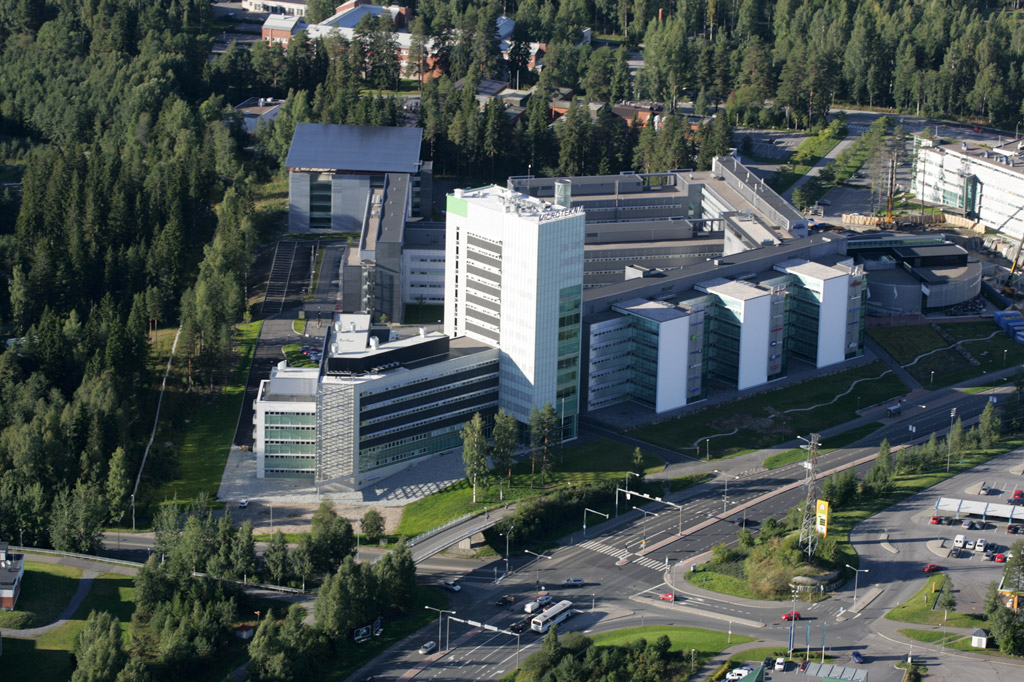
Technopolis Kuopio is the place of study for Savonia's IT-students.

=== Fields of study ===
- Culture (music and dance education, design and graphic design)
- Natural resources and the environment (Bachelor of Agriculture)
- Tourism, catering and domestic services (hotel & restaurant and tourism)
- Social services, health care (nurse, social worker, bioanalytic, physical therapist, maternity nurse, dental hygienist, public health nurse, occupational therapist, first aid nurse)
- Technology, communication and transport (Bachelor of Engineering: electronics, information technology, fire officer, wood, construction, electrical and environmental technology, automation, mechanical engineering and production technology)
- Business and administration (Bachelor of Business Administration: international management, information science, finance, marketing, management, financial administration)

=== Master's degree programmes ===
Required previous studies + these studies are worth 300 ECTS credits.

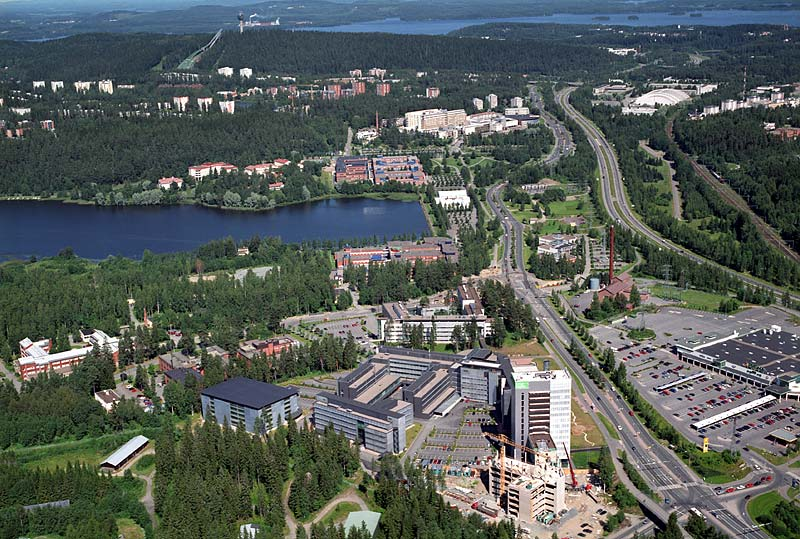
By council decision dated 21. June 2007, Savonia will move its operations in Kuopio to Savilahti to accompany University of Kuopio campus and Technopolis Kuopio.

Master's Degree programmes in the Finnish University of Applied Sciences are distinctive. To meet the applying qualifications, you are required to accumulate three years worth of work experience after your bachelor's degree. The master's degree programmes are very heavily oriented to the needs of the working life - you can study the whole degree in two years while working, in fact, it is even encouraged. The learning assignments can be focused to address the development needs of the student's own employer. Teaching language is Finnish, but some programmes in English program are available. All of the programs are not available every year.

=== International degree programmes ===
While most of the instruction is in Finnish, there are four programs leading to bachelor's degrees and one leading to master's degree which are taught in English:

- International Business Studies specializing in International Management
- Bachelor of Engineering in Information Technology
- Bachelor of Mechanical Engineering

== Students and Faculty ==
Approximately 6,500 students study at the university, 250 of whom are international students. Some 300 students studied abroad in 2004. Savonia has a staff of 500.

== Ownership ==
- Five municipalities of North Savo: Iisalmi, Kiuruvesi, Kuopio, Lapinlahti and Varkaus.

The consortium council term is three years (current 2005–2008). The council has 17 members, of which seven are from Kuopio, five from Varkaus, three from Iisalmi, one from Kiuruvesi and one from Lapinlahti. Municipality votes are shared between members who are attending the council meeting - e.g., if five members from Kuopio are available, they each have a higher number of votes than they would in case of full attendance.

The consortium council selects a consortium board (2005–2008), which has nine members. They are not listed according to their municipality. The board is more active than the council, but still consists of politicians, not professional managers. This dual structure has been recently seen as a somewhat useless allocation of resources and could be removed in ongoing organisational restructuring. Change to a limited company has been under discussion.

The rector serves in a dual role, as he is also director of the owner consortium of municipalities.

== Internal organization ==
- University Board (11* rector, two teachers, two other employees, two students, one division director and three local business representatives)
- Executive Group (12* rector, vice-rector, R&D director, CFO, Quality manager, division directors, executive secretary and the rector of Emercency Services College)
- Division Directors (5* Engineering-, Savonia Business-, Culture-, Health/Social- and Iisalmi -divisions)

== Affiliates ==
On 24 November 2005, backed by the Ministry of Education, Savonia and the University of Kuopio signed an agreement to begin a joint project named North Savo Higher Education Consortium (Pohjois-Savon korkeakoulukonsortio). The first goal is to examine the potential of formalising and expanding current forms of co-operation into a consortium. The decision in June 2007 to move Savonia's operations in Kuopio to the University of Kuopio campus in Savilahti is a cornerstone for future co-operation.

== See also ==
- Technopolis Kuopio
- Education in Finland
- University of Kuopio
