= List of tallest buildings in Finland =

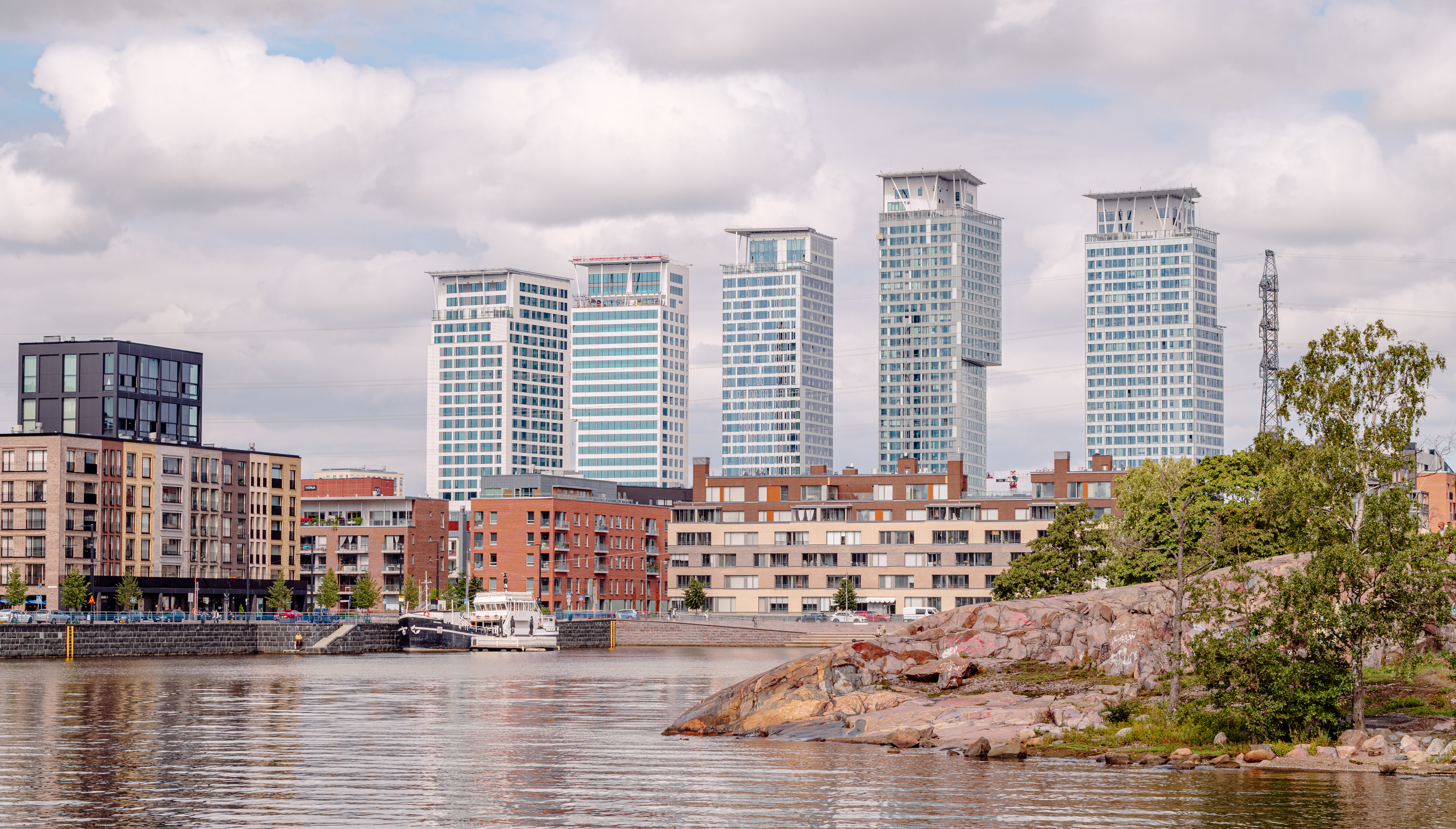
Kalasatama, Helsinki

This is a list of buildings in Finland with a height of over 60 metres (197 feet), excluding churches, observation towers and industrial buildings.

For other types of tall structures in Finland, see List of tallest structures in Finland.

== Current tallest buildings ==
Was the tallest building in Finland upon completion

Rank	Name	Image	Location	Height	Floors	Year
1	Majakka		Helsinki	134 m (440 ft)	35	2019
2	Loisto		Helsinki	124 m (407 ft)	32	2021
3	Lumo One		Helsinki	120 m (390 ft)	31	2022
4	Atlas		Helsinki	114 m (374 ft)	33	2024
5	Horisontti		Helsinki	109 m (358 ft)	26	2025
6	Visio		Helsinki	98 m (322 ft)	24	2023
7	Hotel Torni Tampere		Tampere	88 m (289 ft)	25	2014
8	Cirrus		Helsinki	86 m (282 ft)	26	2006
9	Hyperion		Helsinki	85 m (279 ft)	24	2023
9	Niittyhuippu		Espoo	85 m (279 ft)	24	2017
11	Finago Tower		Espoo	84 m (276 ft)	20	1976
12	Itäkeskuksen maamerkki		Helsinki	82 m (269 ft)	19	1987
13	Herttoniemen Poudantuoja		Helsinki	80 m (260 ft)	21	2021
14	Clarion Hotel Helsinki		Helsinki	78 m (256 ft)	19	2016
15	Kone Building		Espoo	73 m (240 ft)	18	2001
15	Panorama Tower		Espoo	73 m (240 ft)	17	2008
17	Luminary		Tampere	71 m (233 ft)	21	2018
18	Meritorni		Espoo	70 m (230 ft)	22	1999
18	Pitäjänmäki Tower		Helsinki	70 m (230 ft)	20	2001
18	Hotel Torni		Helsinki	70 m (230 ft)	13	1931
21	Leppävaaran Torni		Espoo	68 m (223 ft)	21	2010
22	Itämerentorni		Helsinki	66 m (217 ft)	19	2000
22	Reimarintorni		Espoo	66 m (217 ft)	18	1990
22	Topaasi		Tampere	66 m (217 ft)	17	2021
22	Origo		Oulu	66 m (217 ft)	16	2023
26	Haapaniemenkatu 7-9		Helsinki	65 m (213 ft)	19	1975
26	MicroTower		Kuopio	65 m (213 ft)	14	2004
28	Reimantorni		Espoo	63 m (207 ft)	18	2007
28	Hotel Ilves		Tampere	63 m (207 ft)	18	1986
30	Vuosaari Harbour Gatehouse		Helsinki	62 m (203 ft)	12	2008
31	Opaali		Tampere	61 m (200 ft)	16	2022
31	Sellonhuippu		Espoo	61 m (200 ft)	19	2011
31	Tupalankulma		Järvenpää	61 m (200 ft)	18	2017
34	KOAS Tower		Jyväskylä	60 m (200 ft)	16	2018
34	Keskikatu 6		Kerava	60 m (200 ft)	16	1975
34	Sitadelli 2		Helsinki	60 m (200 ft)	16	2023

== Under construction ==
Rank	Name	City	Height	Floors	Year	Note
1	The Node	Helsinki	130m	32	2027	

== Tallest proposed or approved ==
Rank	Building	City	Height	Floors	Status
1	Keilaniemi Tower	Espoo	154m	34	On hold
2	Kapteeni	Helsinki	137m	37	On hold
3	Keilaranta	Espoo	120m	20	Proposed
4	Luotsi	Helsinki	120m	32	On hold
5	Itämerentori	Helsinki	116m	29	Proposed
6	Helsinki Royal Center	Helsinki	112m	24	On hold
7	Pohjoiskansi T2	Tampere	108m	29	Proposed
8	Keilaniemi Beam	Espoo	106m	30	On hold
	Itsenäisyydenkatu 2	Tampere	91m	26	Proposed
	Ratapihankatu 45	Tampere	88m	26	Proposed
9	Lepakko	Helsinki	88m	24	Proposed
	Fööri	Espoo	85m	20	Approved
	Ratapihankatu 45	Tampere	87,5m	25	Proposed
	Pohjoiskansi T1	Tampere	84m	21	Proposed
	Åkerlundinkatu 7	Tampere	79m	23	Proposed
10	Espoon Skyline	Espoo	72m	22	On hold

== See also ==
- List of tallest structures in Finland
