= Technology Centre Teknia (Kuopio Science Park) =

Research park in Kuopio, Finland

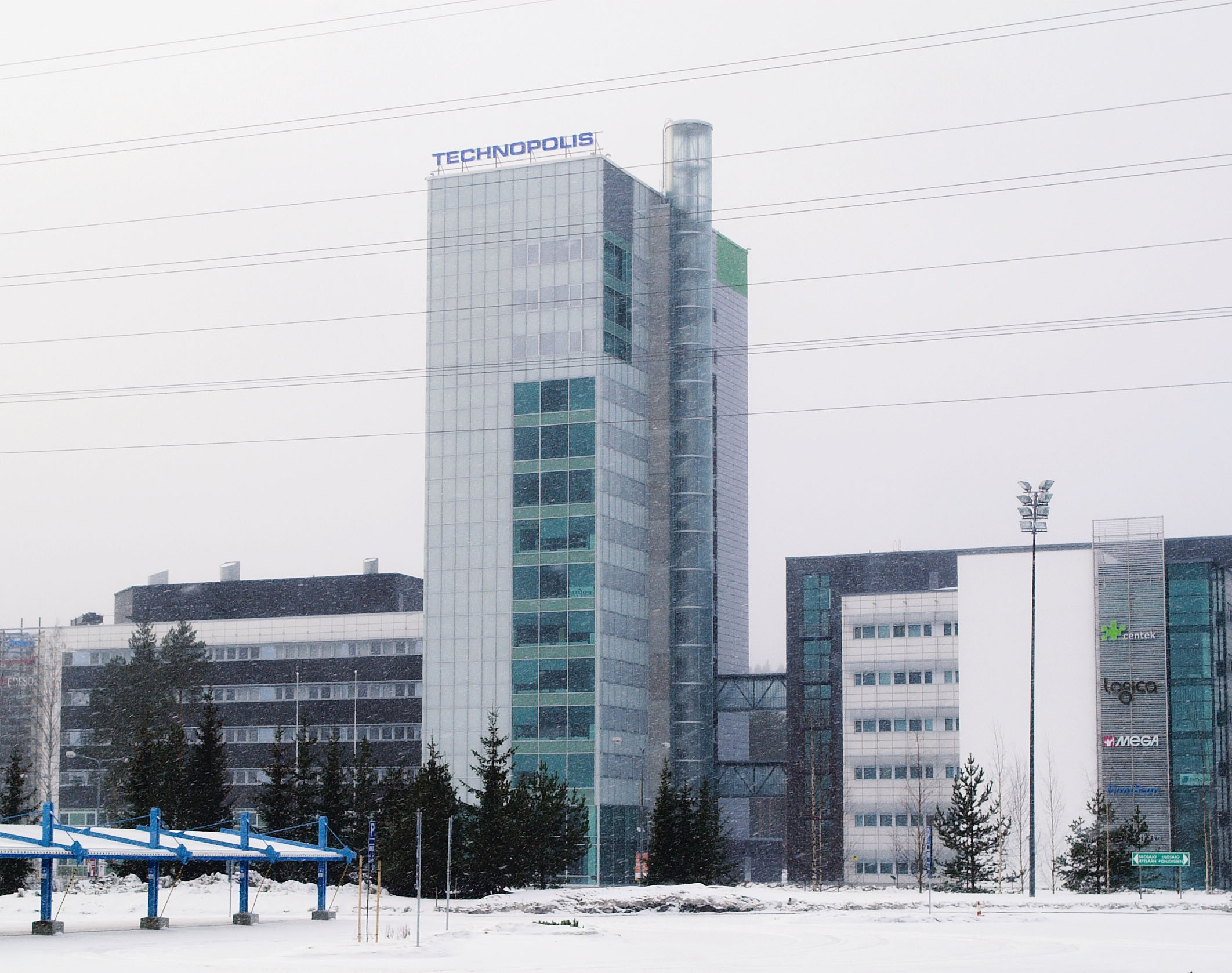
- Location: Kuopio, Finland
- Affiliations: University of Eastern Finland and Savonia University of Applied Sciences

Technology Centre Teknia Ltd. (Teknia), also known as Kuopio Science Park, is a university related research park located in Kuopio, Finland.

Teknia has been the fastest growing Technology Park in Finland for the new millennium. Its tallest building, MicroTower, is 65 m (213 ft) high and one of the tallest structures in Kuopio.

Teknia was acquired in spring 2008 by Technopolis plc for total cost of 18,1 million euros (67 million euros debts included).

== Major organisations located at Kuopio Science Park ==
- University of Eastern Finland, Kuopio campus (formerly University of Kuopio)
- Savonia University of Applied Sciences (Savonia), Administration & Admissions offices, IT & Electronics Engineering education unit.
- Kuopio University Hospital
- Technology Centre Teknia

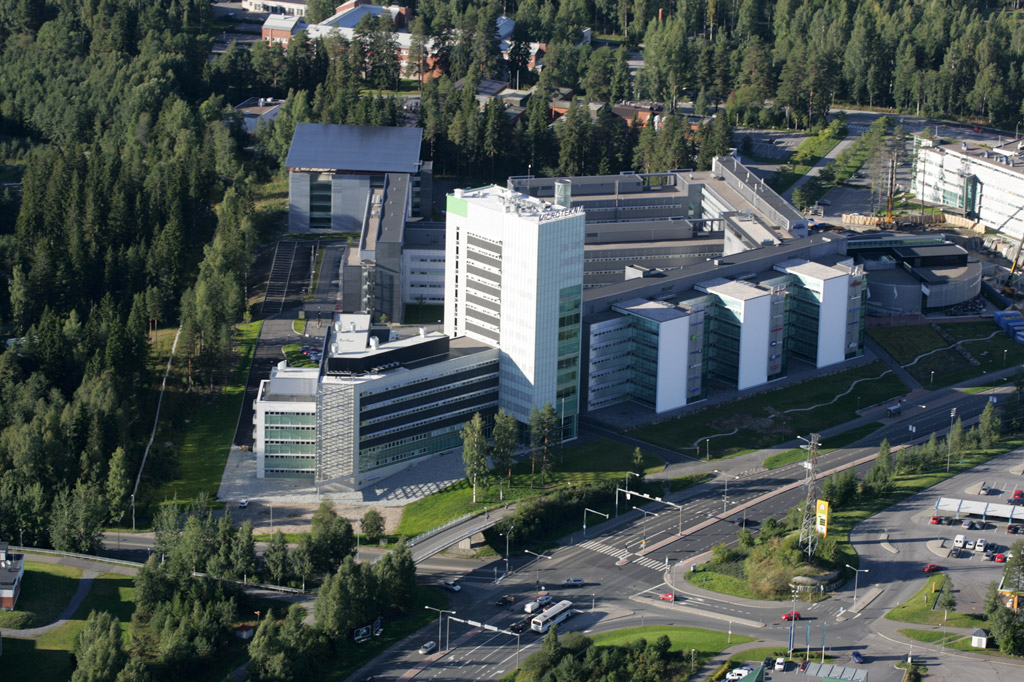
Technology Centre Teknia Ltd., Microteknia area of Kuopio Science Park

== Offices of national organisations ==
- Neulanen Research Centre (public, occupational and environmental health): National Public Health Institute (KTL) , The Finnish Institute of Occupational Health (FIOH) and Finnish Food Safety Authority (EVIRA)
- Own building: The Geological Survey of Finland (GTK)
- In Teknia-buildings: VTT Technical Research Centre of Finland

== Technology Centre Teknia ==
- Manages the infrastructure of *teknia -dubbed office buildings
- Offers startup- (business hatchery) and internationalization services for companies (also houses a wide variety of other producers of these services)
- Has a side office in Shanghai, China, which manages health care projects between Finland and China.
- Houses joint-use laboratories, e.g. Sensor Development Lab, where UEF, Savonia & Honeywell jointly develop new microsensors.
- Houses a total of 300 small businesses and local offices of multinational corporations and a few with a whole office building such as Honeywell and Ark Therapeutics.
- World's first gene based pharmaceutical plant, by Ark Therapeutics was opened for business in 2007.
- Mediteknia Research Centre, WellTeknia , Centek
- A. I. Virtanen Institute and Bioteknia Research Centre (gene therapy, neurosciences, molecular medicine, pharmacology)
- Microteknia Research Centre and Teknia Technology Centre (IT)

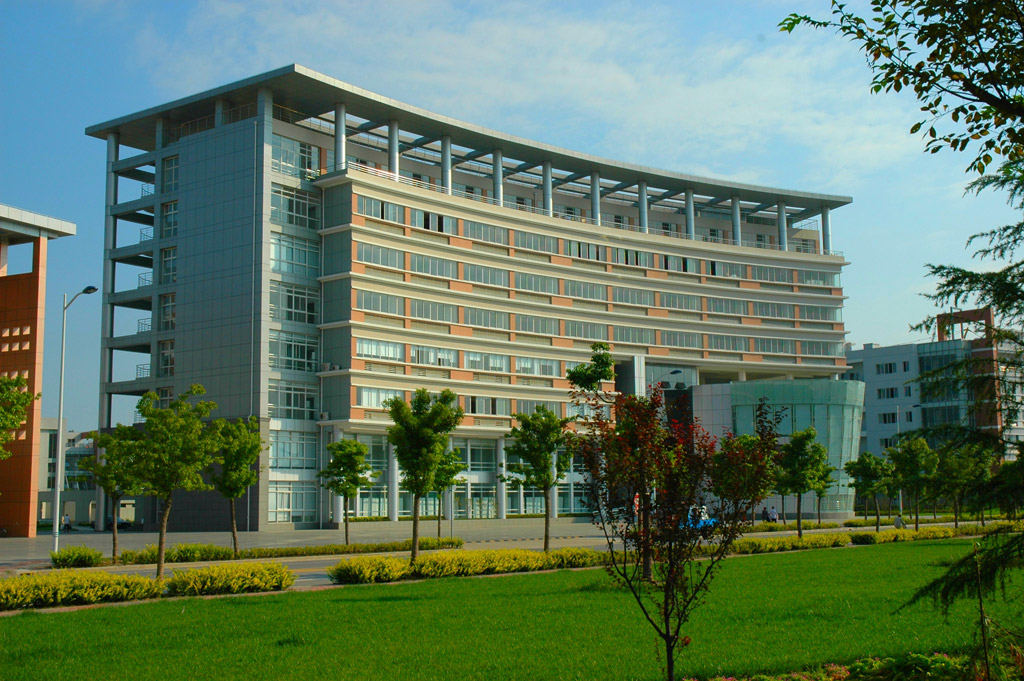
Technology Centre Teknia Ltd., Side office in the Zhangjiang Hi- Tech Park in Shanghai. In November 2003 Teknia was the first Finnish Technology Centre to open an office in Shanghai.

The businesses based in Teknia specialize in information and communication technology and wellbeing technology (agrobiotechnology, drug design, and health care technology).

Teknia's International Cooperation Partner Parks: Zhongguancun Software Park (zPark, located in "the Chinese Silicon Valley"), Wuxi Life Science & Technology Park, Shanghai Zhangjiang Hi-Tech Park, Hong Kong Science and Technology Parks, IZET Innovationszentrum ltzehoe, TEKNIKBYN Västerås Technology Park, University of Surrey, University Enterprise Laboratories, Inc. (University of Minnesota)

=== Construction stages ===
- Tietoteknia 1990
- Bioteknia 1 1994
- Bioteknia 2 1999
- Microteknia 1 2000
- Microteknia 2 2002
- MicroTower 2004
- Microteknia 3 2005
- Microteknia 4 2006
- Innoteknia 2007

== See also ==
- List of tallest buildings in Finland
