= Redi (shopping centre) =

Shopping mall in Finland

Redi shopping centre
- Kauppakeskus Redi

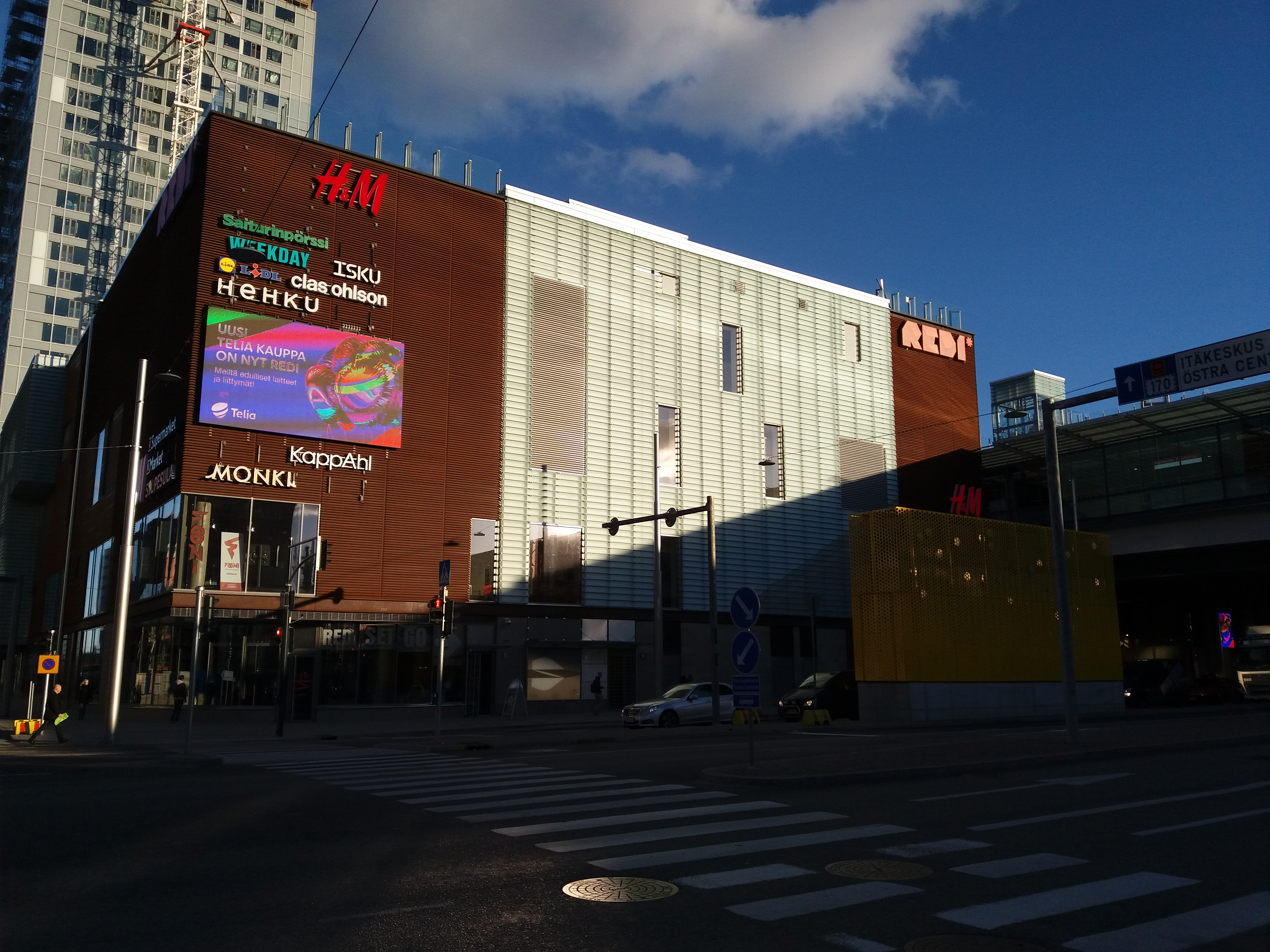
- The shopping centre Redi photographed in 2018, with Majakka under construction in the background
- Location: Kalasatama, Helsinki, Finland
- Coordinates: 60°11′13″N 24°58′45″E
- Address: Hermannin rantatie 5,
- Opened: September 20, 2018
- Owner: SRV Oy, Ilmarinen, Osuuspankki, Lähi-Tapiola
- Num. of stores: 175
- Floor area: 64,000 square metres (690,000 sq ft)
- Floors: 5 + park on roof
- Website: www.redi.fi (in Finnish)

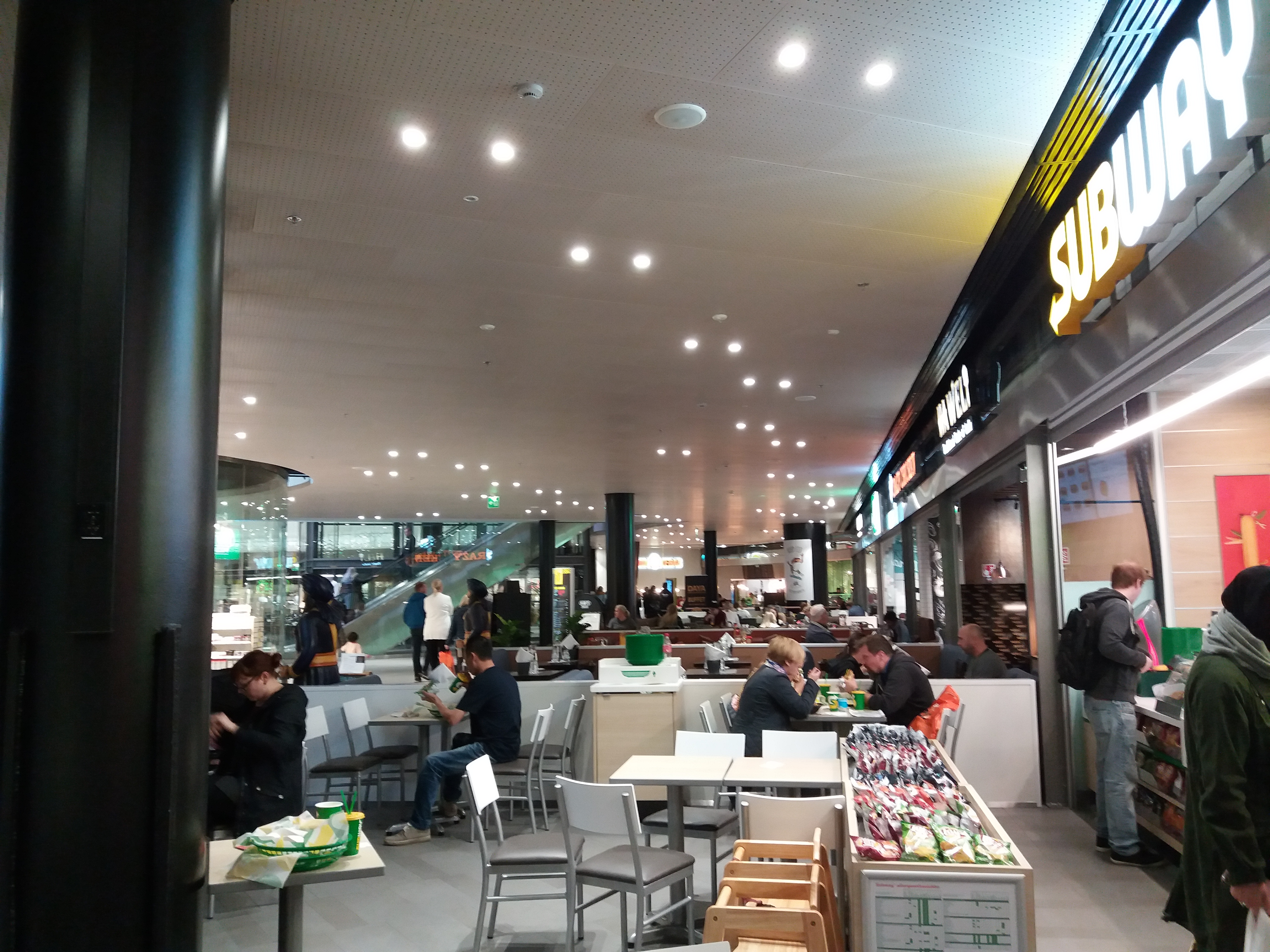
Subway restaurant in Redi

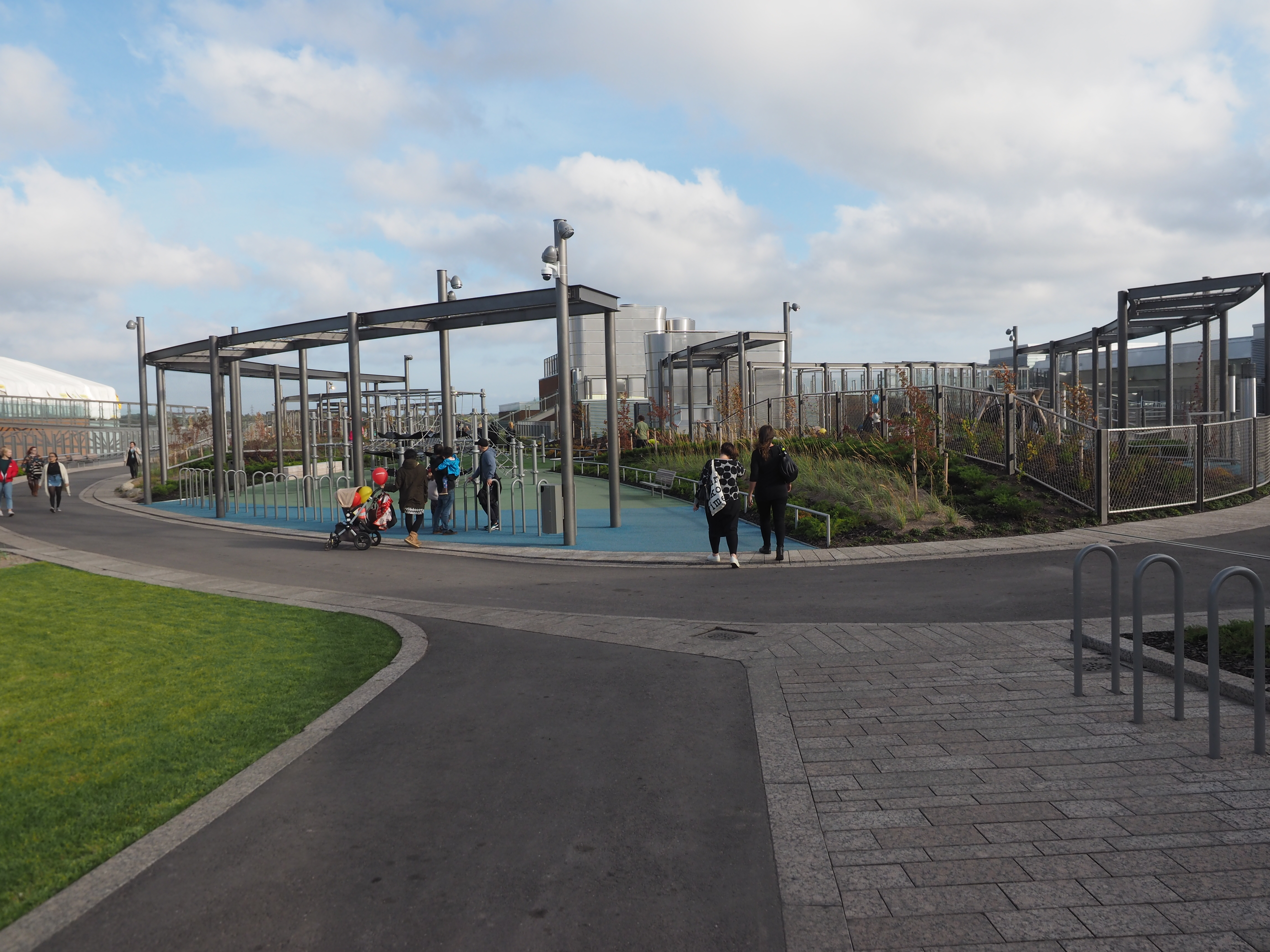
Redi's rooftop terrace.

Redi (Finnish: Kauppakeskus Redi; stylized as REDI) is a shopping centre in Kalasatama, Helsinki, Finland. With its gross leasable area of 64,000 square metres (690,000 sq ft), it is the eighth largest shopping centre in Finland.

Redi was completed in September 2018. Redi was designed by architect Pekka Helin. The shopping centre is part of the Redi complex, which includes the highest residential building in Finland, the 134-meter and 35-storey Majakka. The complex had been estimated to cost over one billion euros.

The shopping centre is divided into two parts, named Stadi and Sköne. At the street level, the street Kalasatamankatu, running in north–south direction, demarcates the division. The Kalasatama metro station is located on the third floor of the centre and is directly accessible from Redi.

Redi's visitor amounts faded following the opening of the mall on September 20, 2018.

== Shops and services ==
Redi has 175 shops in a total of about 200 business spaces. The largest stores are K-Supermarket, Lidl, Clas Ohlson and H&M. The shopping centre has a total of 43 restaurants and cafes. On the ground floor, there are several restaurants serving a variety of fast-food, plus an on-street Food Market, which consists of several restaurants.

On the roof of the shopping centre there is an open park, Bryga, which is the size of the Esplanadi park in Helsinki.

== Name ==
In Finnish, "Redi" means a sheltered anchoring place in front of a harbor.

== See also ==
- Hertsi
- Mall of Tripla
- List of tallest buildings in Finland
