= Majakka =

Skyscraper in Helsinki, Finland

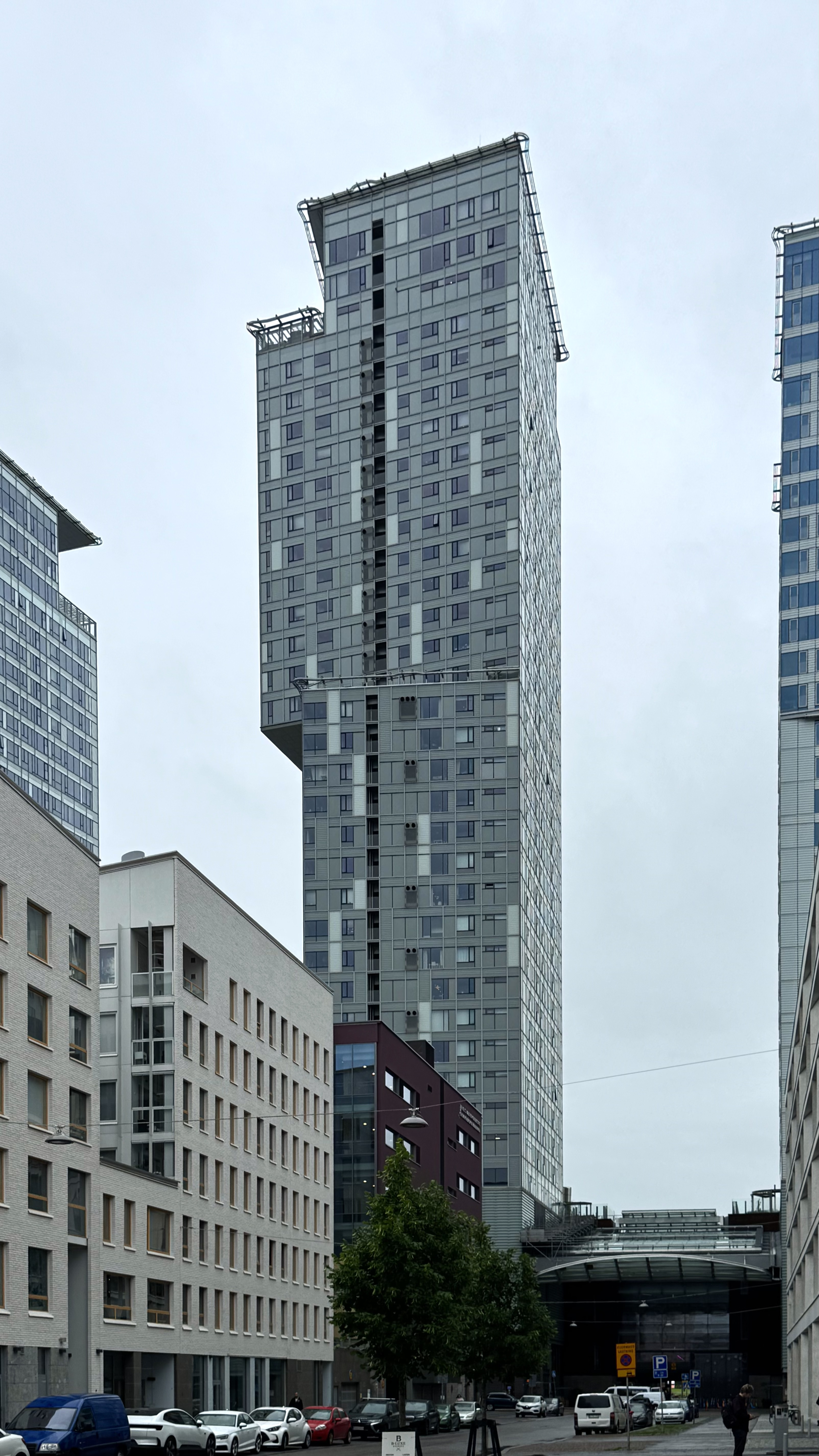
- Majakka in June 2026

- Location within Helsinki (mainland)

General information
- Status: Completed
- Type: Residential
- Location: Kalasatama, Helsinki, Finland, Kalasatamankatu 9A
- Coordinates: 60°11′15.1″N 24°58′47.1″E
- Inaugurated: 2019
- Owner: SRV

Height
- Architectural: 134 m (440 ft)

Technical details
- Floor count: 35

Design and construction
- Architect: Pekka Helin
- Architecture firm: Arkkitehtitoimisto Pekka Helin & Co
- Main contractor: SRV

Website
- srv.fi/redi

Majakka (Finnish pronunciation: [ˈmɑjɑkːɑ]; lit. 'lighthouse') is a skyscraper in Kalasatama, Helsinki, Finland. At 134 metres (440 ft) tall, it is currently the 2nd tallest building in Finland, and the first skyscraper in Finland. It is divided into 35 floors, and contains 283 residences. The 5th floor has a garden open to the public. The tower is conjoined with the Redi shopping centre and the Kalasatama metro station. The complex will include seven other residential towers, as well as a hotel and offices.

After delays related to water damage, the first tenants moved in on 25 November 2019.

== See also ==
- List of tallest buildings in Finland
