= Jukka Mönkkönen =

Finnish Professor of Biopharmacy (born 1959)

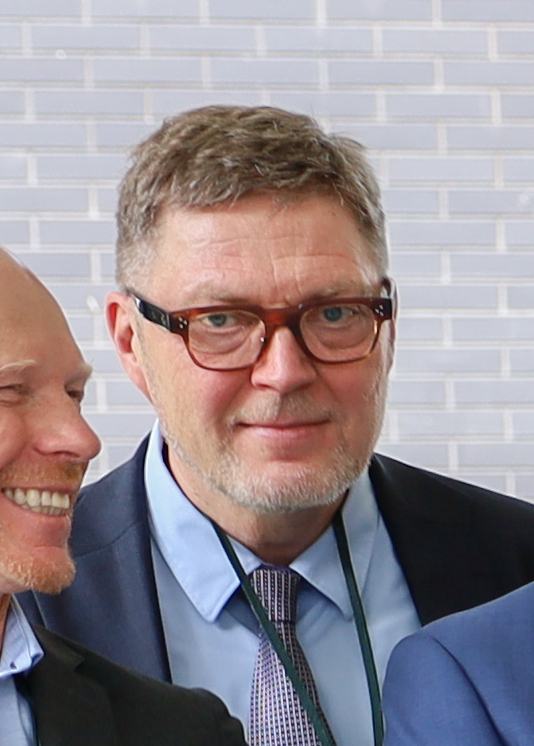
Jukka Mönkkönen 30.11.2022 (cropped)

Jukka Mönkkönen (born 16 August 1959 in Kuopio, Finland) is a Finnish Professor of Biopharmacy and Rector of the University of Eastern Finland. Jukka Mönkkönen served as the Academic Rector of the University of Eastern Finland in 2012–2014, he was then elected Rector for a five-year term in 2015 and re-elected for another five-year period starting on 1 January 2020. The decision was taken unanimously by the board of the University of Eastern Finland on 21 May 2019. In 2023, Jukka Mönkkönen was elected Chairman of the Board of Directors of SYK (Finnish University Properties Ltd), the company that owns and rents properties on university campuses.

Jukka Mönkkönen obtained his master's degree in pharmacy from the University of Kuopio in 1986, and his doctoral degree in pharmacy in 1991. He has held several research and teaching positions and, since 1998, he has been Professor of Biopharmacy. Mönkkönen has served as the Dean of the Faculty of Pharmacy of the University of Kuopio, as the Dean of the Faculty of Health Sciences of the University of Eastern Finland, and as the Academic Rector and Rector of the University of Eastern Finland.

His scientific research has focused on the molecular pharmacology of drugs affecting bone metabolism, and on the mechanisms of drug absorption.

== Legacy ==
Jukka Mönkkönen was the academic rector of the University of Eastern Finland during the period 2012-2014, and the rector during the period 2015-2023. During his mandate, the University of Eastern Finland lost relevance in all international rankings. In the Times Higher Education rankings, the university descended from the position #300-350 in 2012 (#3 in Finland) to the position #600-800 in 2023 (#10 in Finland). Similarly, in the QS World University Rankings, the university ranked #302 in 2012, to be downgraded to the position #548 among all universities in the world in 2023.

The management style of his mandate often conflicted with the rest of the academic community, as it was reflected in the regular well-being surveys performed during his period as a rector. In the 2015 survey on occupational well-being, staff reported some of the lowest satisfaction scores among the 13 Finnish universities surveyed, across nearly all categories. These poor results were repeated with no significant improvements in the surveys in 2017, 2019, 2021 and 2023. On the other hand, the financial situation of the university was in balance after his mandate, and the university was considered as being successful in implementing its strategy.
