= Itämerentorni =

Office tower in Helsinki, Finland

Coordinates: 60°9′51″N 24°54′51″E

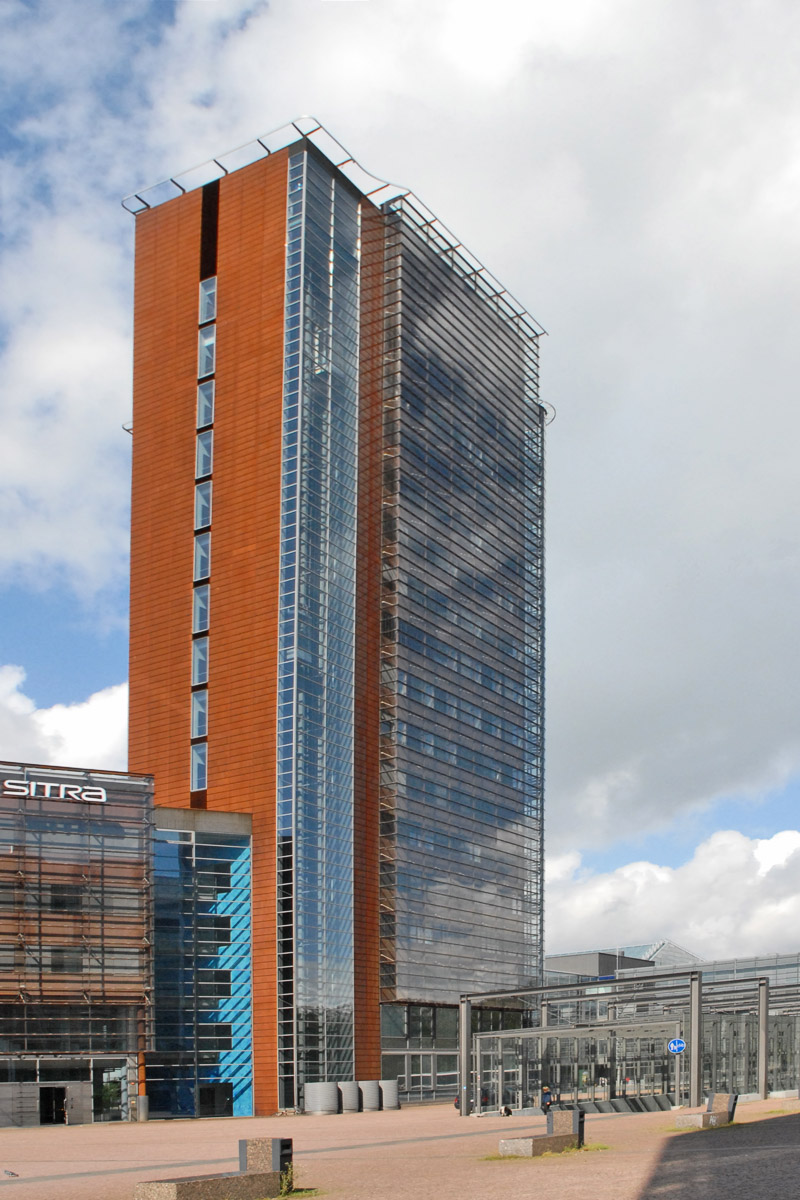
The Itämerentorni high-rise building seen from the Itämerentori square.

Itämerentorni (Finnish for "Baltic Sea Tower") is a high-rise office building located in the district of Ruoholahti in Helsinki, Finland. It is part of the Itämerentorni complex which also includes a lower, curved building at the foot of the tower. The building serves as an office for SITRA and PricewaterhouseCoopers. The building is located near the Länsiväylä highway at the Itämerentori square. The building is 66 metres tall and has 18 floors. The building was completed in 2000 and was designed by architect Pekka Helin. In 2000 the building was awarded the steel building of the year prize.

== General ==
The building employs about 600 people as of 2004. The lower part of the building has three five-floor office wings curved around an inner courtyard and a work healthcare centre. The high-rise building has office spaces, and negotiation spaces and a sauna on the top floor. The ground floor holds the lobby and negotiation spaces. There is a covered, heated inner courtyard of almost a thousand square metres in the middle of the building. The two basement floors of the building host technical spaces, storage rooms and social spaces. There is a parking garage for 370 cars underneath the ground.

In 2012 the insurance company Etera and SITRA sold the building to Exilion Capital Oy for a total price of 85 million euro. The office spaces in the high-rise building remained in use for SITRA. The lower part of the building hosts an S-market grocery store.

== Building ==
=== Structural framework ===
The framework of the building consists of steel pillars and beams and intermediary floor elements made of steel-reinforced concrete. The basement floors were cast in place. The intermediary floors and the roof of the inner courtyard of the Itämerentorni building are post-tensed and cast in place. The gallery is topped with a curved steel-supported glass structure 30 metres in diameter. The courtyard is surrounded by glass-walled office spaces with intricate steel-supported glass walls.

=== Facade ===
The facade of the building has a double facade structure. The choice was made because of city image and architectural reasons as well as a desire to cut down on investments and energy consumption in HVAC technics. Another reason was to lessen the impact of weather on the outer walls and details, to cut down on maintenance costs and to improve noise dampening and information security.

The principal material of the facade is weathering steel, acting as a link between the red brick architecture of the old industrial buildings in the area and the high tech buildings. Reasons for selecting the material include its ecological properties, such as full recyclability. The outer steel surfaces consists of weathering steel cassettes 1.5 millimetres thick and the inner surfaces of small-waved warped sheets 1.0 millimetres thick. Weathering steel is used on the grill, shaped steel, coping, attachment of the cassettes and partly in the supporting pillars. The facade of the tower also uses acid-proof steel intended to lighten the appearance of the facade.

The outer walls are made of thermally structured, string-like light elements, supported by INP structures between the vaults. The glass coating is made of tempered glass 6 to 8 millimetres thick and of laminated glass in the curved part. The area of the glass plates is 2692 x 855 millimetres in average. One glass plate weighs about 30 kilograms. The windows are fixed, with vents opening to an intermediary space 925 millimetres wide with gravitational venting. The windows are fitted with motorised blinds. Maintenance of the double facade is done through exterior beams on the water roof.

== Gallery ==
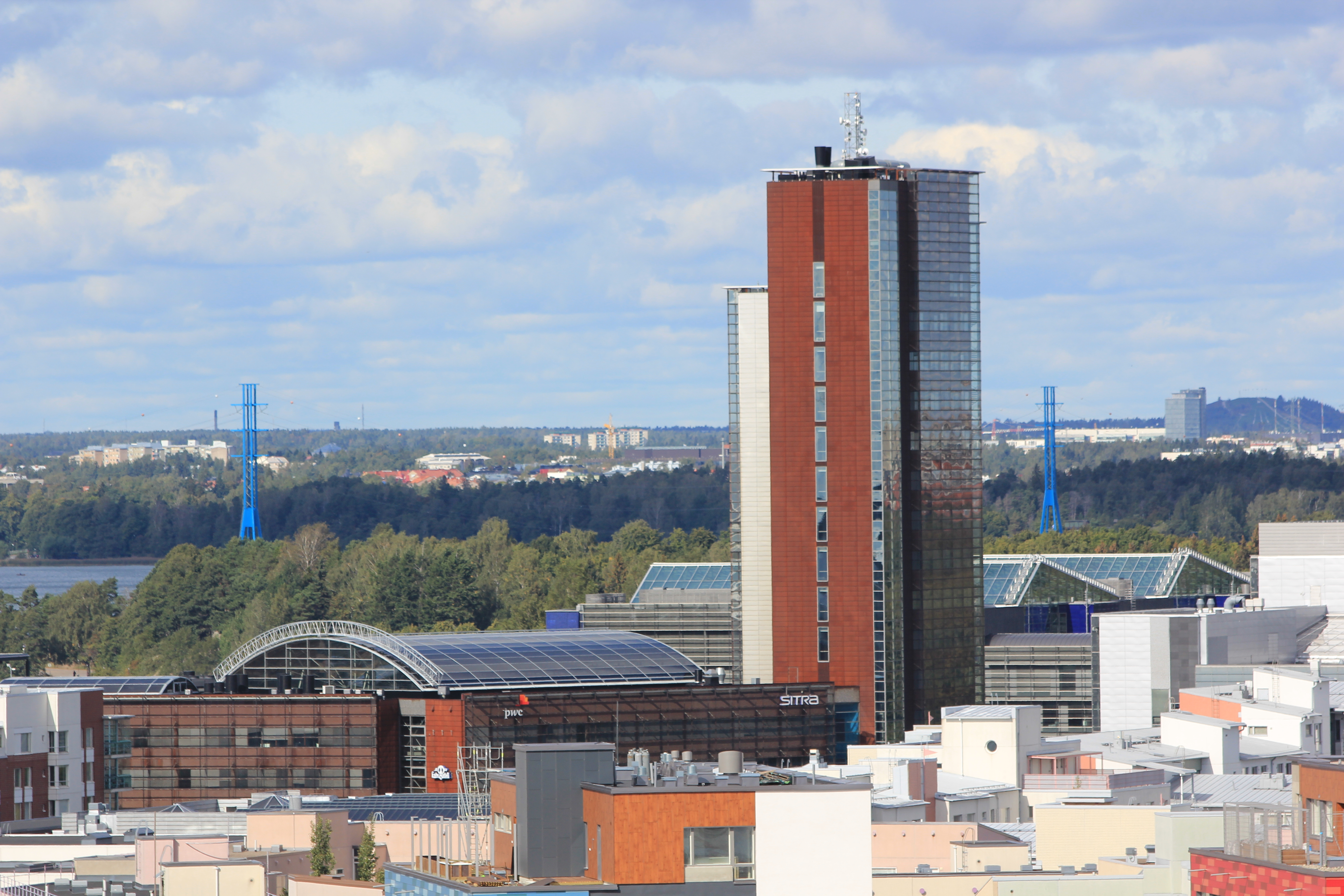
The Itämerentorni complex with the Itämerentorni high-rise building seen from the rooftop terrace of the Verkkokauppa.com electronics store.

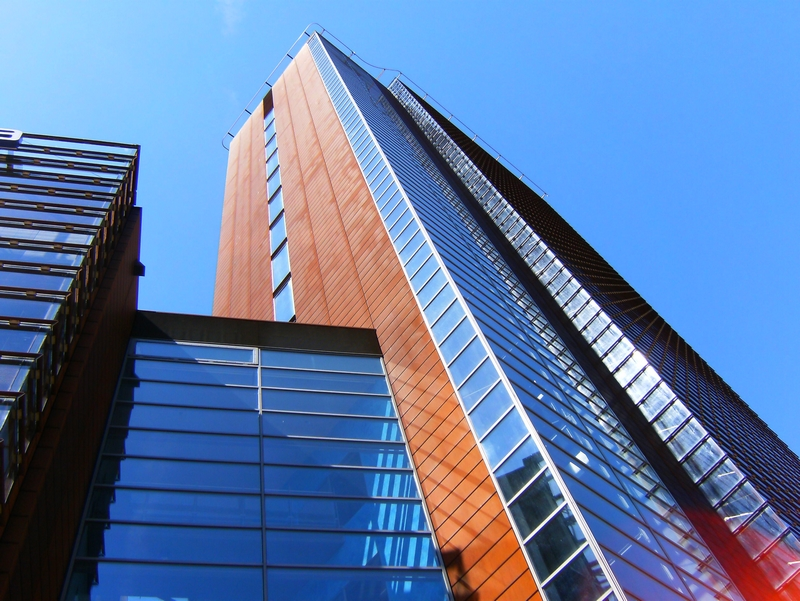

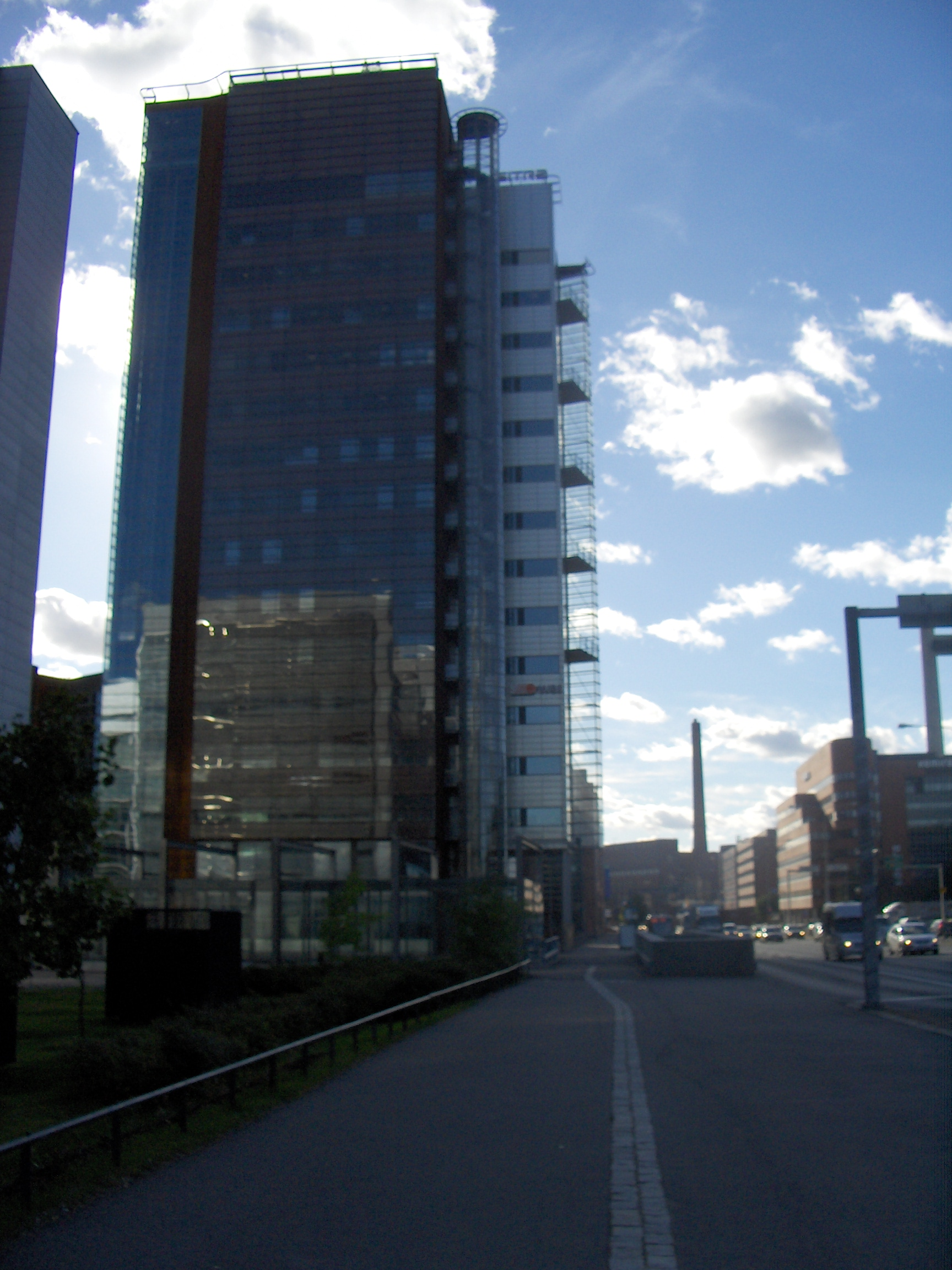

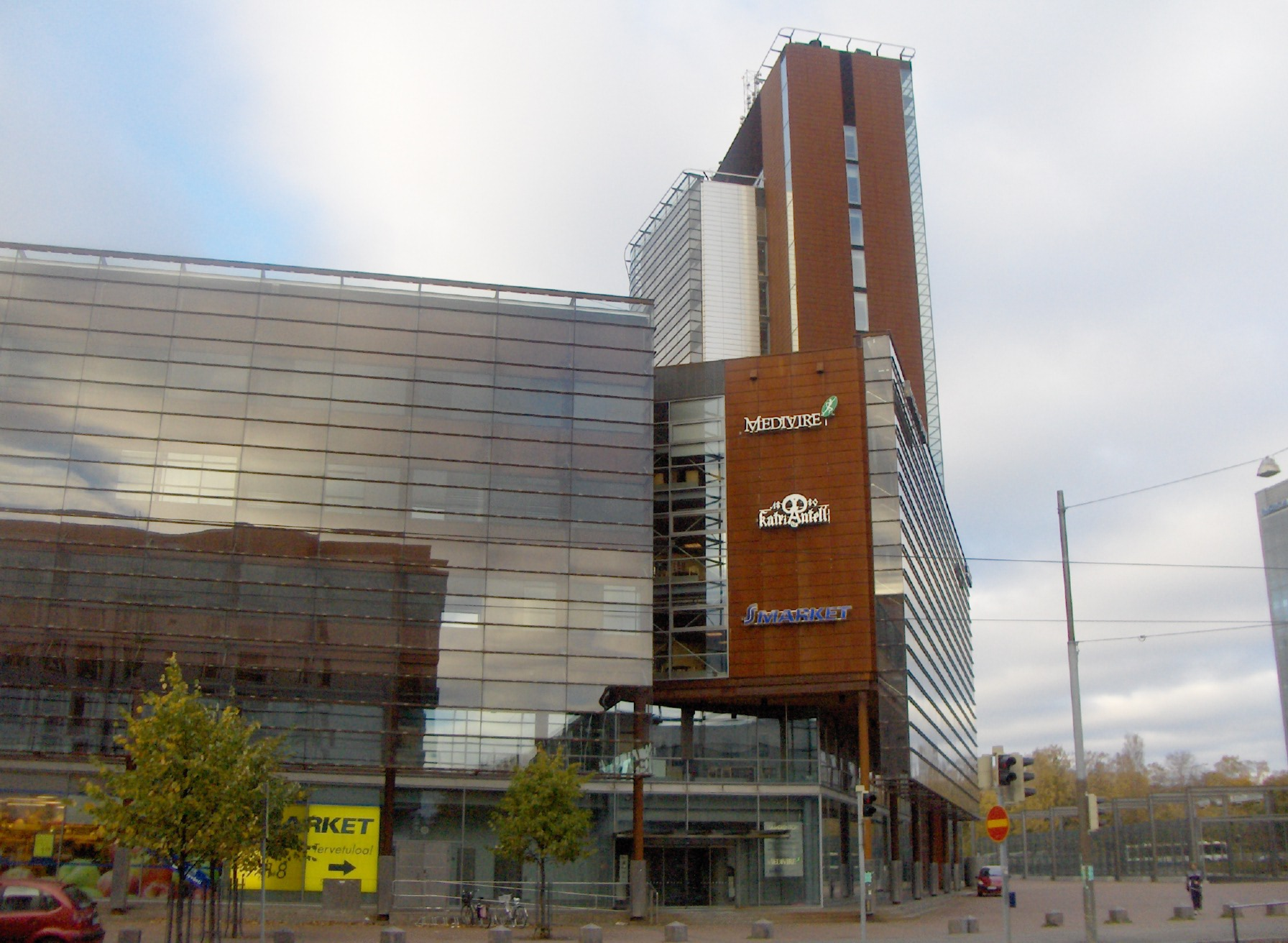

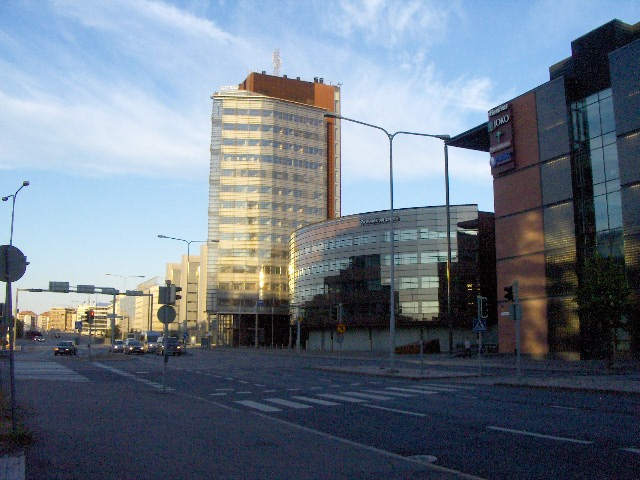
