= University of Eastern Finland =

University in Finland

- Itä-Suomen yliopisto
- Type: Public
- Established: 2010; 16 years ago
- Rector: Jukka Tapio Määttä, Jussi Pihlajamäki and Laura Hirsto (Vice Rectors)
- Total staff: 3200
- Students: 17,600 (2026)
- Location: Joensuu, Kuopio, Eastern Finland, Finland; 62.8925°N 27.6783°E
- Campus: Campuses in Joensuu and Kuopio
- Nickname: UEF
- Website: www.uef.fi

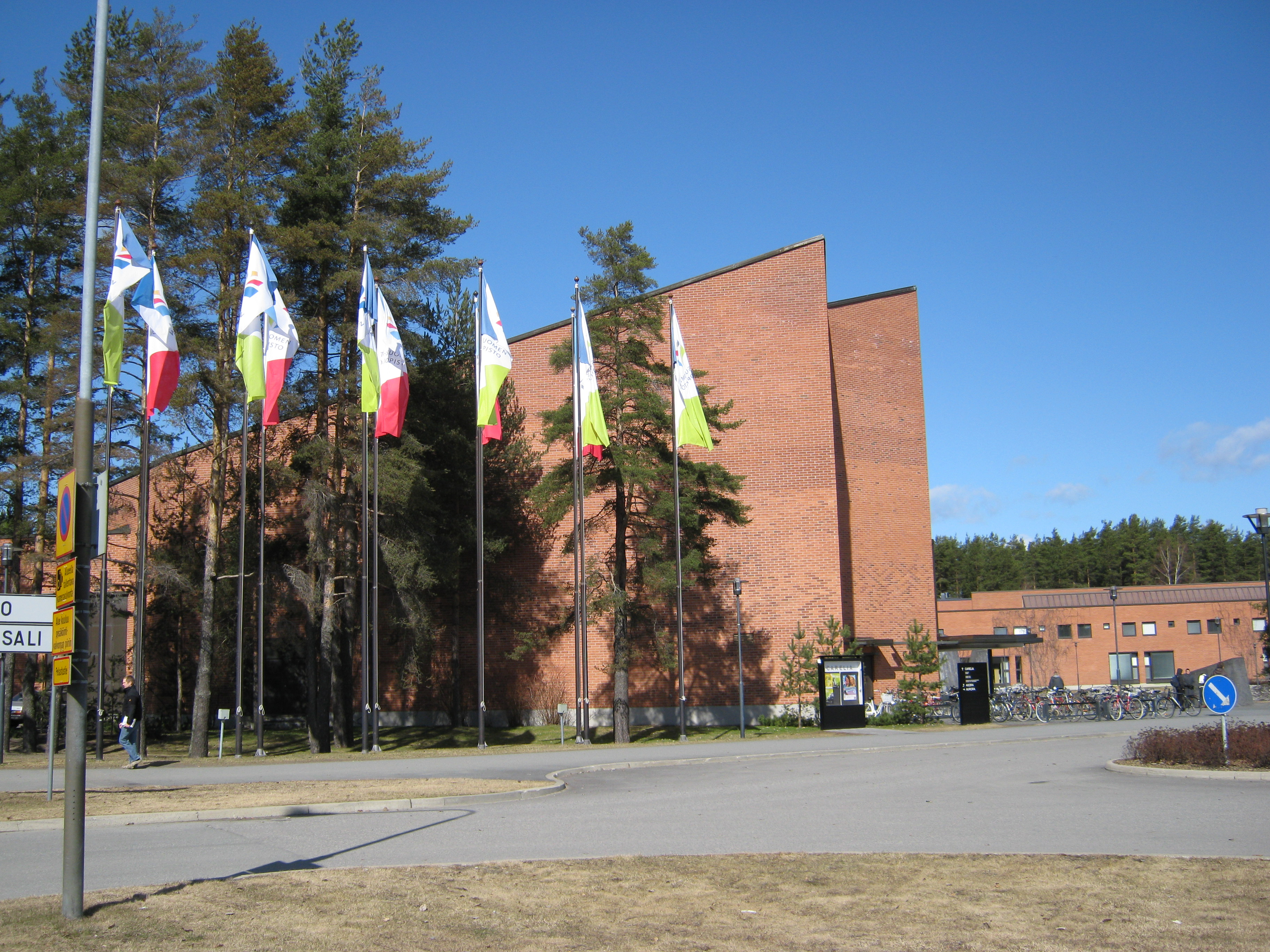
Carelia building in the university's Joensuu campus

The University of Eastern Finland (Finnish: Itä-Suomen yliopisto) is a university in Finland, which was founded in 2010 and has campuses in Joensuu and Kuopio.

== History ==
The Finnish Parliament passed the Universities Act on June 16, 2009, which, among other things, extended the autonomy of Finnish universities by giving each university an independent legal personality, as a public corporation or a foundation. Also, universities’ management and decision-making systems were reformed.

=== Merger ===
2006 - The University of Joensuu and the University of Kuopio decided to intensify their mutual cooperation as part of the Ministry of Education program addressing the structural development of Finnish higher education institutions. The project for the University of Eastern Finland was selected as one of the Ministry of Education spearhead projects. The project formed a working group led by Professor Reijo Vihko.

2007 - Professor Reijo Vihko's working group submitted a report proposing that cooperation between the two universities be further intensified. The two universities' senates formally agreed to merge, thereby forming a new university, deciding on its name, the University of Eastern Finland, a few weeks later.

2008 - The organization structure and strategy of the University of Eastern Finland were completed. The University of Joensuu and the University of Kuopio received a joint right to confer degrees in Economics and Business Administration.

2009 - The first joint student admissions to the University of Eastern Finland were carried out in Economics and Business Administration and in Social Sciences in 2009. In May 2009 The Sino-Finnish Environmental Research Centre (SFERC), a collaborative undertaking of the University of Joensuu, the University of Kuopio, and the University of Nanjing, focused on higher education and research addressing forestry, energy and environmental issues, opened in Nanjing, China, the first such unit established by a Finnish university in China. SFERC operates at the University of Nanjing campus as a permanent satellite campus for the University of Eastern Finland.

2010 - The University of Eastern Finland formally began operations in January 2010, which formally ended the operations of the University of Joensuu and of the University of Kuopio. The University of Eastern Finland began offering dentistry education in 2010.

2020 - In 2020, the University of Eastern Finland was granted the educational responsibility in logopedics (speech therapy) and in 2022 in engineering.

== Locations ==
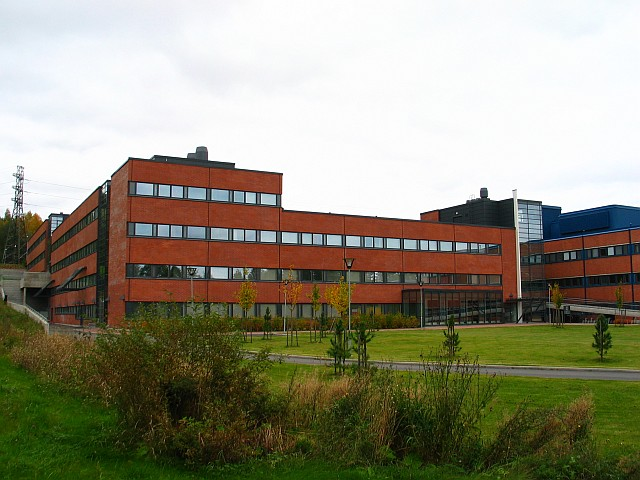
One of the main buildings, Mediteknia, on the Kuopio campus

The University of Eastern Finland has two campuses, one in Joensuu and the other in Kuopio, which are approximately 130 kilometres (80 mi) apart.

== Administration ==
The administration of the University of Eastern Finland is overseen by its Board, the Rector and the Academic Rector, its Collegiate Body, and its Faculty Councils and their Deans. The university's practical administrative tasks fall to the staff of University Services.

Board

The Board of the University of Eastern Finland is the university's highest executive organ. The Board of the University of Eastern Finland is composed of a total of 10 members, four of whom are external members. Board members serve terms lasting three years.

Rector and Academic Rector

The University of Eastern Finland has a Rector and an Academic Rector. The rector and academic rectors are chosen by the board. In 2019, the board led by Lea Ryynänen-Karjalainen appointed Jukka Mönkkönen unanimously as rector for a second five-year term, starting in 2020. The board was composed of 10 members: Jaakko Kiander (Vice Chair), Jari Jolkkonen, Jukka Pelkonen, Erkki Pesonen, Juho Pulkka, Jaana Rekolainen, Tomi Rosti, Olli Siirola and Matti Tolvanen. Tapio Määttä was chosen as the Academic Rector. The University of Eastern Finland will reform its rector model by appointing a rector and two vice rectors for the term of office beginning in 2025. The current terms of office of the Rector and the Academic Rector will end on 31 December 2024. The Board of the University of Eastern Finland elected Academic Rector, Professor, LLD Tapio Määttä as the new Rector of the university for the five-year term beginning on 1 January 2025. The Board of the University of Eastern Finland has elected the Dean of the Faculty of Health Sciences, MD Jussi Pihlajamäki, as the Vice Rector for Research and the Vice Dean of the Philosophical Faculty, Professor of Educational Sciences, DEd Laura Hirsto to the post of Vice Rector for Education.

Collegiate Body

The Collegiate Body of the University of Eastern Finland consists of 24 members, eight each representing the university's professors, its teaching, research and general staff, and its student body. Members serve 4-year terms, except for those representing the student body, who serve 2-year terms.

Faculty Councils and Deans

The University of Eastern Finland has four faculty councils: 1) the Philosophical Faculty, 2) the Faculty of Science, Forestry and Technology, 3) the Faculty of Health Sciences, and 4) the Faculty of Social Sciences and Business Studies, each headed by a dean.

== Research and education ==
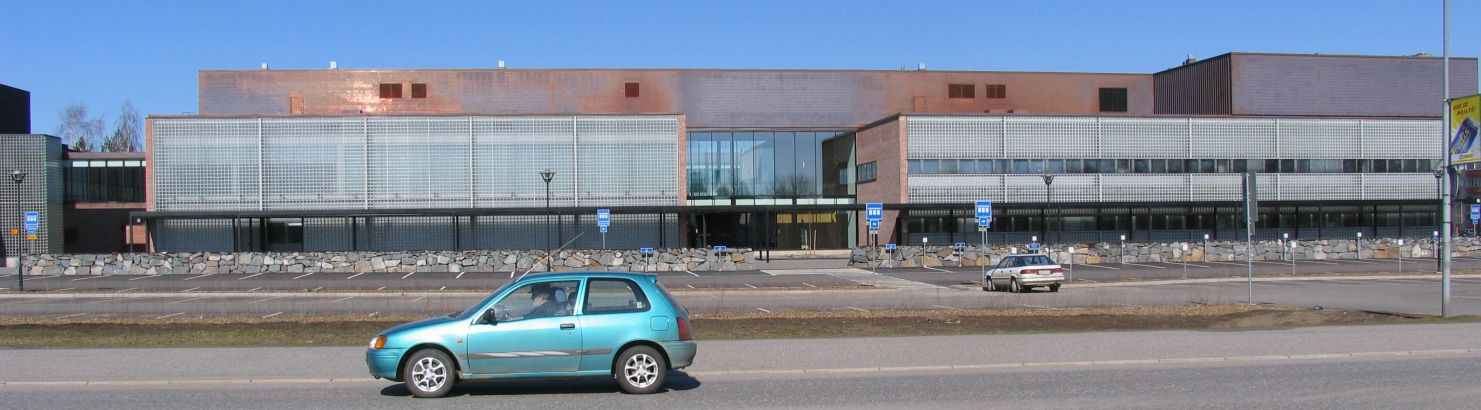
The main building of the Joensuu campus

The University of Eastern Finland is a multidisciplinary university. The four faculties of the UEF offer teaching in nearly 100 major subjects and degree programs. The university's annual student intake is approximately 3,300 and the university attracts nearly 31 000 applications for admission every year. The university offers Bachelor's, Master's and doctoral level education in 12 fields of study: medicine and pharmacy, humanities, education, economics and business administration, natural sciences, forest sciences, psychology, theology, health sciences, social sciences, law and engineering.

== Profile areas in research ==
The profile areas in research of the University of Eastern Finland are built around four global challenges:

- Ageing, lifestyles and health
- Diversifying learning and interaction
- Cultural encounters, mobilities and borders
- Environmental change and sustainable use of natural resources.

The University of Eastern Finland approaches the above-mentioned challenges through research carried out within its interdisciplinary Research Communities (RCs). The university's Research Communities are:

- Basic, Translational and Clinical Cardiovascular Medicine
- Borders, Mobilities and Cultural Encounters
- Climate Forcing, Ecosystems and Health
- Drug Discovery and Delivery Technologies
- Effectiveness of Social and Health Services
- Forests and Bioeconomy
- Learning in Digitalized Society
- Metabolic Diseases
- Multidisciplinary Cancer Research
- Musculoskeletal Diseases
- Neuroscience
- Photonics
- Sustainable Co-management of Water Resources and Aquatic Environments
- Sustainable Resource Society: Circular Economy, Energy and Raw Materials

== International cooperation ==
The University of Eastern Finland is an international research university with an extensive network of foreign partners. The university has concluded bilateral agreements on cooperation with approximately 70 universities abroad. Furthermore, the university is involved in several international networks and discipline-specific projects, and the university's teaching and research staff and students are active in participating in various mobility programmes.

The university is an active member of the University of the Arctic. UArctic is an international cooperative network based in the Circumpolar Arctic region, consisting of more than 200 universities, colleges, and other organizations with an interest in promoting education and research in the Arctic region.

The university participates in UArctic's mobility program north2north. The aim of that program is to enable students of member institutions to study in different parts of the North.

== Statistics ==
As of 2026, the University of Eastern Finland has a total staff of about 3,500 and 17,600 students.

The Finnish Ministry of Education and Culture granted the University of Eastern Finland the right to confer degrees in the field of law as from 1 August 2013, expanding the university's fields of study to a total of 13, and making the university the most multidisciplinary university in Finland.

== Rankings ==
University rankings

Global – Overall
- ARWU World: 701–800 (2024)
- QS World: =604 (2026)
- THE World: 501–600 (2024)
- USNWR Global: =487 (2023)

Since launching its operations in 2010, the University of Eastern Finland has appeared frequently, indeed annually, in several rankings listing the world's leading universities although losing position at almost every ranking in the last years. In the rankings of the world's top universities under 50 years of age published by QS World University Rankings and Times Higher Education World University Rankings, the University of Eastern Finland was ranked #71-80 by QS (2021), and 49th by THE (2019).

In 2012, the University of Eastern Finland was ranked among the leading 300-350 universities in the world by Times Higher Education. In 2023, the University of Eastern Finland was ranked in the 601-800 universities in the world, with all indicators reflecting a poorer performance. Similarly, in 2012 it was ranked the 302 in the QS World University Rankings, a position that has been down to the 551-560 universities in the world. This trend started in 2015, overlapping in time with the mandate of Jukka Mönkkönen as rector of the university. In that year the university scored the 267 in the QS World University Rankings, its highest score, and it has descended positions since then. Similarly, in the 2020 Academic Ranking of World Universities published by Shanghai Jiao Tong University, the University of Eastern Finland was ranked among the leading 501–600 universities in the world, a position that has been reduced to the 601-700 in 2023.

== See also ==
- Kuopio University Hospital
