= Carl Gustaf Emil Mannerheim =

Finnish military leader and statesman (1867–1951)

Baron Carl Gustaf Emil Mannerheim
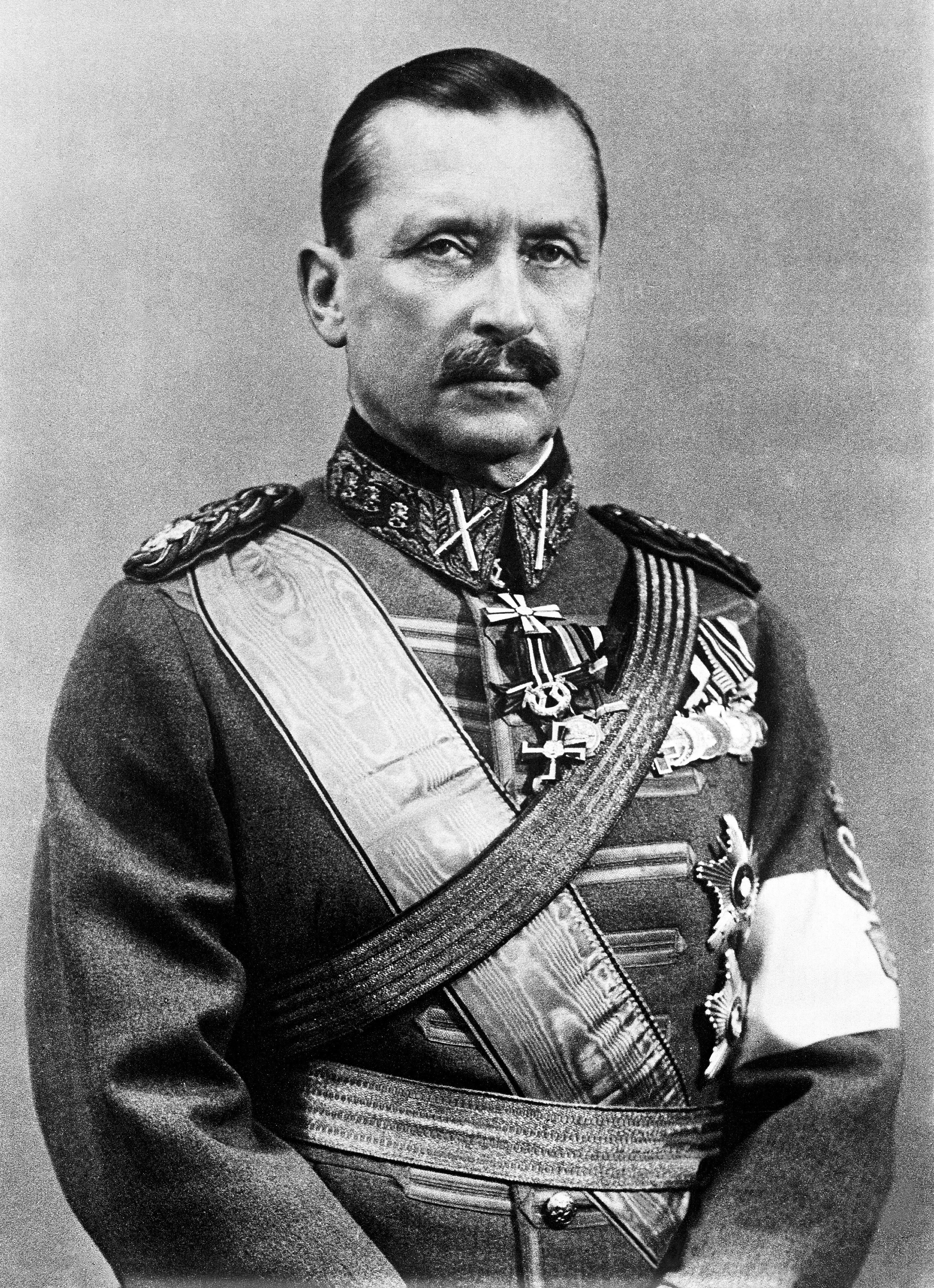
- Mannerheim in 1940

6th President of Finland
- In office 4 August 1944 – 4 March 1946
- Prime Minister: Antti Hackzell; Urho Castrén; Juho Kusti Paasikivi
- Preceded by: Risto Ryti
- Succeeded by: Juho Kusti Paasikivi

Regent of Finland
- In office 12 December 1918 – 26 July 1919
- Preceded by: Pehr Evind Svinhufvud
- Succeeded by: Kaarlo Juho Ståhlberg (as President of the Republic)

Chief of Defence of Finland
- In office 28 January 1918 – 30 May 1918 as Supreme Commander of the forces of the Republic of Finland
- President: Vacant
- Preceded by: Office established
- Succeeded by: Karl Fredrik Wilkama
- In office 17 October 1939 – 12 January 1945; Acting: 17 October 1939 – 20 November 1939
- President: Risto Ryti; Himself
- Preceded by: Hugo Viktor Österman
- Succeeded by: Erik Heinrichs

Personal details
- Born: 4 June 1867 Askainen, Grand Duchy of Finland, Russian Empire
- Died: 27 January 1951 (aged 83) Lausanne, Vaud, Switzerland
- Resting place: Hietaniemi Cemetery, Helsinki, Finland
- Party: Independent
- Spouse: Anastasie Arapova (m. 1892; div. 1919)
- Children: 3 (Note: Including a stillborn son.)
- Parents: Carl Robert Mannerheim; Hedvig von Julin
- Relatives: Sophie Mannerheim (sister); Carl Mannerheim (brother); Eva Mannerheim-Sparre (sister); Carl Gustaf Mannerheim (paternal grandfather); John von Julin (maternal grandfather); Albert von Julin (maternal uncle); Georg C. Ehrnrooth (grandnephew); See Mannerheim family; See Julin family
- Profession: Military officer, statesman

Military service
- Allegiance: Russian Empire (1889–1917); Finland (1918–1946)
- Branch/service: Imperial Russian Army; White Guard; Finnish Army
- Years of service: 1889–1917 (Imperial Russia); 1918 (Finnish Whites); 1939–1945 (Finland)
- Rank: Lieutenant general (Russia & White Army); Marshal of Finland (Finland)
- Battles/wars: Russo-Japanese War; First World War; Russian Civil War; Finnish Civil War; Second World War; Winter War; Continuation War; Lapland War

Baron Carl Gustaf Emil Mannerheim (Finland Swedish: [kɑːrl ˈɡʉstɑv ˈeːmil ˈmɑnːærhejm], 4 June 1867 – 27 January 1951) was a Finnish military commander and statesman. He served as the military leader of the Whites in the Finnish Civil War (1918), as regent of Finland (1918–1919), as commander-in-chief of the Finnish Defence Forces during World War II (1939–1945), and as the president of Finland (1944–1946). He became Finland's only field marshal in 1933 and was appointed honorary Marshal of Finland in 1942.

Born into a Swedish-speaking aristocratic family in the Grand Duchy of Finland, Mannerheim made a career in the Imperial Russian Army, serving in the Russo-Japanese War and the Eastern Front of World War I and rising by 1917 to the rank of lieutenant general. He had a prominent place in the 1896 coronation ceremonies for Emperor Nicholas II and later had several private meetings with him. After the Bolshevik coup of November 1917 in Russia, Finland declared its independence on 6 December, but soon became embroiled in the 1918 Finnish Civil War between the Whites, who were the troops of the Senate of Finland (supported by troops of the German Empire), and the socialist Reds.

A Finnish delegation appointed Mannerheim as the military chief of the Whites in January 1918, and he led them to victory, holding a triumphal victory parade in Helsinki in May. After spending some time abroad, he was invited back to Finland to serve as the country's second regent, or head of state, from December 1918 to July 1919. He secured the recognition of Finnish independence by multiple Entente powers (Note: Including the United Kingdom, the United States, the Empire of Japan and the Kingdom of Italy; see Independence of Finland#List of recognition.) and, despite being a monarchist, formally ratified the republican Constitution of Finland. He then ran against K. J. Ståhlberg in the first Finnish presidential elections in 1919 but lost and quit politics. Mannerheim helped found the Mannerheim League for Child Welfare in 1920 and headed the Finnish Red Cross from 1922 to his death. He was restored to a central role in national defence policy when President Svinhufvud appointed him as the Chairman of the Finnish Defence Council in 1931, tasked with making preparations for a potential war with the Soviet Union. It was also agreed that he would temporarily take over as commander-in-chief of the country's armed forces in the event of a war.

Accordingly, after the Soviet Union invaded Finland in November 1939 in what became the Winter War, Mannerheim replaced President Kyösti Kallio as commander-in-chief, and occupied the post for the next five years. He became a unifying symbol of the war effort and part of the core leadership of the country. He personally participated in the planning of Operation Barbarossa and led the Finnish Defence Forces in an invasion of the Soviet Union alongside Nazi Germany known as the Continuation War (1941–1944). In 1944, when the prospect of Nazi Germany's defeat in World War II became clear, the Parliament of Finland unanimously appointed Mannerheim as president, and he oversaw peace negotiations with the Soviet Union and the United Kingdom. This led to the Lapland War in which German troops were expelled from Finnish territory. Already in declining health, Mannerheim resigned the presidency in 1946 and spent much of his remaining life in a sanatorium in Switzerland, where he wrote his memoirs, and where he died in 1951.

Participants in a Finnish survey taken 53 years after his death voted Mannerheim the greatest Finn of all time. During his own lifetime he became, alongside Jean Sibelius, the best-known Finnish personage at home and abroad. According to historian Tuomas Tepora,^{[fi]} a cult of personality began to be built around Mannerheim after the civil war.

Given the broad recognition in Finland and elsewhere of his unparalleled role in establishing and later preserving Finland's independence from the Soviet Union, Mannerheim has long been referred to as the father of modern Finland, and The New York Times called the Finnish capital Helsinki's Mannerheim Museum, memorializing the leader's life and times, "the closest thing there is to a [Finnish] national shrine".

== Early life and military career ==
=== Name ===
As Carl was a common name in Mannerheim's family, he was known by his middle name Gustaf. Because he disliked his third name, Emil, he wrote his signature as C. G. Mannerheim, or simply Mannerheim. He often signed letters as Field Marshal G. Mannerheim, Field Marshal Mannerheim or G. Mannerheim.

During his career in the Russian military, he was known as Gustav Karlovich Mannergeim (Russian: Густав Карлович Маннергейм; briefly also as Karl Gustafovich, Russian: Карл Густафович) in official documents, and while serving as Regent of Finland, he used the finnicised form of his name, Kustaa Mannerheim, but later abandoned it. His first names are most commonly shortened as C. G. E., as reflected on his tombstone.

In a military fashion, he often signed military documents by just his military rank and surname.

=== Ancestry ===
The Mannerheims, originally from Germany as Marhein, became Swedish noblemen in 1693. In the latter part of the 18th century, they moved to Finland, which was then an integral part of Sweden. For a long time, it was thought that the Mannerheim family came from the Netherlands. King Charles XI of Sweden ennobled Augustin Marhein in 1693 at which time the family name Marhein was changed to Mannerheim.

After Sweden lost Finland to the Russian Empire in 1809, Mannerheim's great-grandfather, Count Carl Erik Mannerheim (1759–1837), son of the Commandant Johan Augustin Mannerheim, became the first head of the executive of the newly-autonomous Grand Duchy of Finland, an office that preceded that of the contemporary Prime Minister. His grandfather, Carl Gustaf Mannerheim (1797–1854), was an entomologist and jurist.

Mannerheim's father, Count Carl Robert Mannerheim (1835–1914), was both a playwright and industrialist, with modest success in both endeavours. He was an exception to the family's tradition as he never became a soldier or an official. Carl Robert Mannerheim was known for his radical political views, and when he inherited the title of Graf from his father, the officials disapproved of him, thinking of him as political satirist. As a man with a sharp wit, Carl Robert Mannerheim clearly expressed his view of the Russian authorities. He spent a lot of time abroad, but after turning 50 years old, he moved to Helsinki, founded a shop selling office machinery of the "Systema" brand, and proved to be a busy and systematic businessman.

In 1862 Carl Robert Mannerheim married Hedvig Charlotta Hélène von Julin (1842–1881), the daughter of a wealthy industrialist, John von Julin (1787–1853). The Julin family had also moved to Finland from Sweden. The Mannerheim couple had seven children, four sons and three daughters: Sophie Mannerheim, Carl Mannerheim (1865–1915), Carl Gustaf Emil Mannerheim (1867–1951), Johan Mannerheim, Eva Sparre, Anna Mannerheim (1872–1886) and August Mannerheim (1873–1910). Carl Robert Mannerheim had a further daughter by his second wife Sofia Nordenstam (1849–1915), Marguerite (Kissie) Gripenberg (1884–1958).

=== Childhood ===
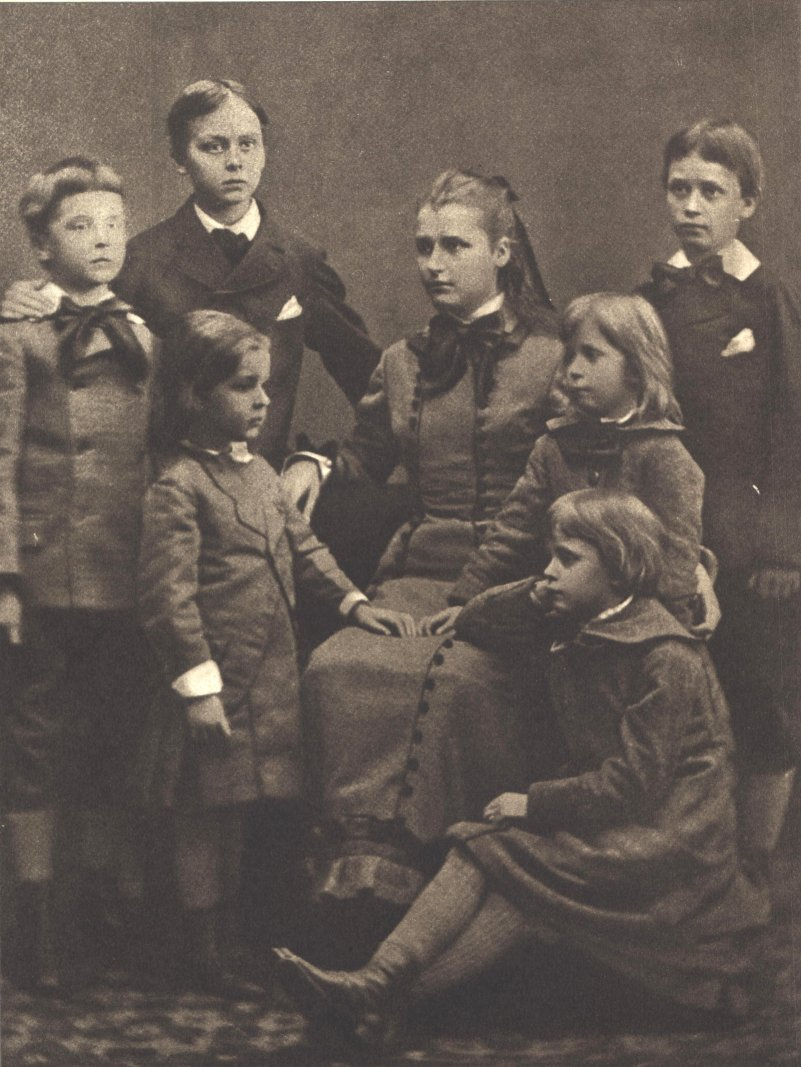
The Mannerheim siblings, c. 1880; Gustaf is standing on the right

Gustaf Mannerheim was born in Louhisaari Manor, in Askainen parish (currently Masku), on 4 June 1867. After Mannerheim's heavily indebted father left the family in 1880 for his mistress, a daughter of Baron and General Johan Mauritz Nordenstam, the young Mannerheim's mother and her seven children went to live with her aunt Louise; but Mannerheim's mother died the following year. Mannerheim's maternal uncle, Albert von Julin (1846–1906), then became his legal guardian and financier of his later schooling. The third child of the family, Mannerheim inherited the title of Baron.

Mannerheim (right) with his older brother Carl (left) in 1885

Mannerheim is said to have enjoyed playing military games and "leading the troops". He was first taught by a female Swiss home teacher, and at the age of seven he started going to school in Helsinki, where he lived with his father. From 1874 to 1879 he and his brother Carl attended the Böök private lyceum, where he was expelled for a year in autumn 1879 for throwing stones at the windows.

=== Education ===
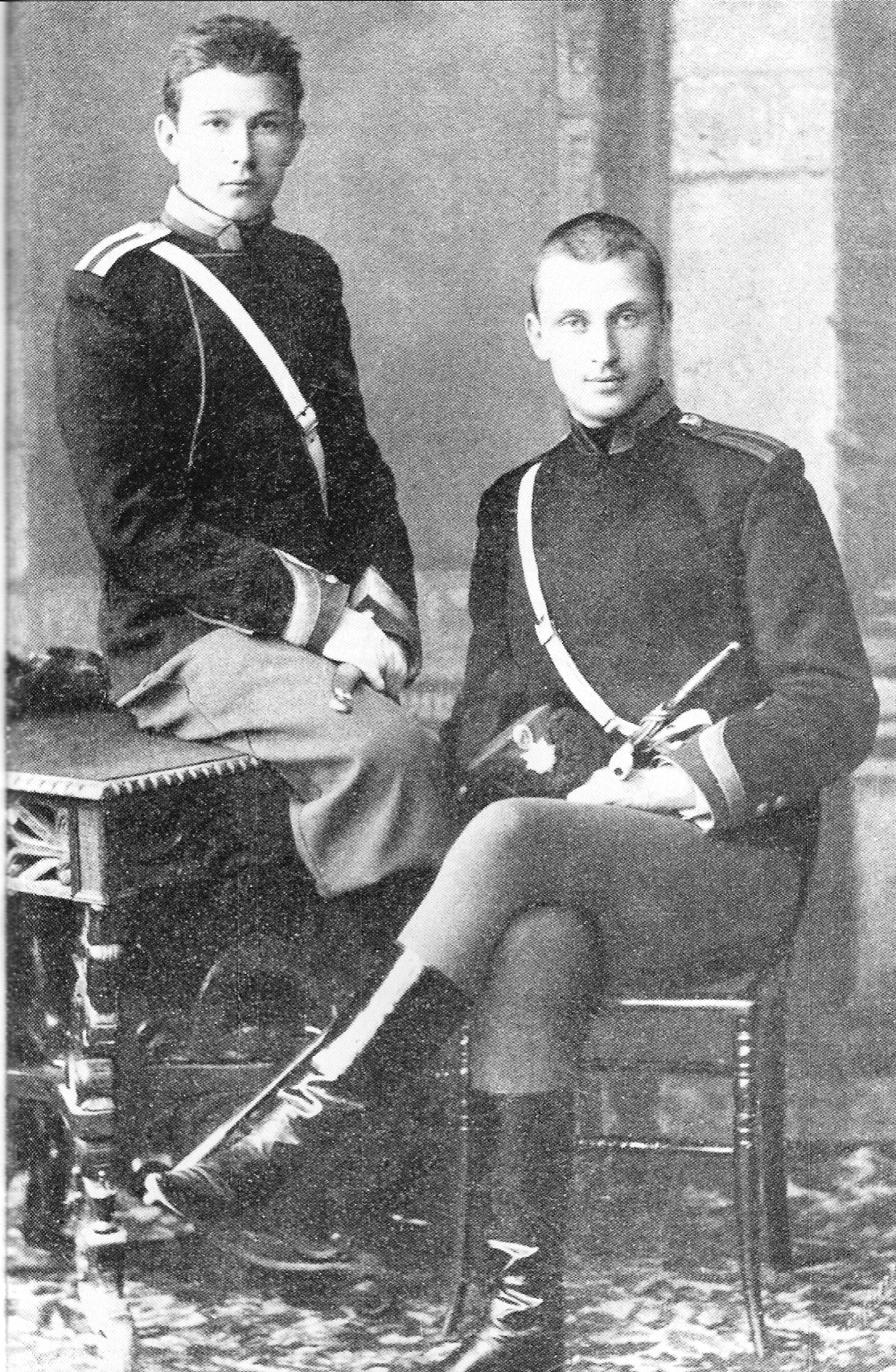
Mannerheim (right) with a fellow student, Antanas Ričardas Druvė, in Nicholas Cavalry College, Saint Petersburg, late 1880s.

From 1881 to 1882 Mannerheim went to a school in Hamina preparing students for the Hamina Cadet School, a state school educating aristocrats for the Imperial Russian Army. The Hamina Cadet School was the only school to give military education in Finland at the time. However, Mannerheim felt hatred towards the city of Hamina, which was also evident from his behaviour.

Mannerheim was accepted to the Hamina Cadet School in 1882 at the age of 14, where he began his military career.

However, Mannerheim was left behind in class for one year because he managed to score only seven points of twelve in an examination in June 1883. This extra year was of help, as the next year Mannerheim was moved to the first general class with the second-best grades. He did best in French and Swedish as well as history, but did worse in Russian and Finnish. Among other students of his age and younger cadets Mannerheim was in a clear leadership position.

Mannerheim's financial situation was poor, and he often had to borrow money from his caretaker Albert von Julin. He also did not like his time at the Hamina Cadet School: he could not tolerate the atmosphere at the school or its tight regulations, and he was punished often.

Mannerheim had hoped that after the Hamina Cadet School, he would get to the Page Corps military academy in Saint Petersburg, which was one of the most prestigious military academies in the country. The academy only allowed students with a hereditary noble title. Another requirement was that the student's father, grandfather or great-grandfather had a military rank of at least lieutenant general or an equivalent civilian rank. (Civilian ranks were contrasted to military officer ranks according to a system devised by Peter the Great.) Mannerheim got his father Carl Robert Mannerheim to leave an application to the Page Corps, but the academy's director major general Neovius did not recommend Mannerheim to the academy claiming his skills in French and Russian were not good enough. Because of Neovius's letter, Mannerheim's application to the academy was rejected, and he fell into a deep depression.

His future is indeed bleak. He does not seem to have any ambition, nor any understanding to improve himself and to attend the Cadet School so he could support himself.
(Mannerheim's grandmother Eva about the young Cadet School student)

Mannerheim's depression also manifested as rebellion towards the Hamina Cadet School, and he was expelled on 22 July 1886. According to his memoirs, Mannerheim had left without permission and spent the night at the home of a registrar he knew, the 35-year-old deputy judge Hugo Elfgren. In the next morning, he was discovered there by a warrant officer at the Cadet School. According to education committee at the cadet board Mannerheim had "left later in the night with a person of ill repute to the countryside to this person's residence". The person this referred to was the chief of the telegraph station Agathon Lindholm, who was known to be possibly homosexual. The letter also mentioned Mannerheim's "immoral aberrations and degrading lecherousness". The school could have put the strictest form of its expulsion policy into use, which would have prevented Mannerheim from studying at any Finnish school or university ever again, but the board held a vote and decided to use a more lenient policy on the condition that Mannerheim's family would leave a voluntary application for him to leave the school.

After his expulsion, Mannerheim studied Russian in Kharkiv before passing his university entrance examinations as a private student at the Helsinki Private Lyceum in June 1887. From 1887 to 1889, Mannerheim attended the Nicholas Cavalry College in Saint Petersburg. Mannerheim was recommended to the Nicholas Cavalry College by the general Johan Fredrik Gustav Aminoff, who was friends with the college's director Pavel Adamovich von Plehwe. The entry requirements to the college were practically having a noble title and having graduated from cadet school or matriculated. Only the best applicants were selected to the college and the entry requirements were strict.

Mannerheim graduated from the Nicholas Cavalry College on 10 August 1889. His graduation examination had gone well, and especially his grades in Russian had improved. In the spring of the same year, before being promoted to cornet, Mannerheim had been promoted to a porte d'épée Junker. This rank corresponded to the rank of a soldier promoted from the rank and file to a junior officer, who could serve as the warrant officer of a troop.

In January 1891, Mannerheim joined the Chevalier Guard Regiment in Saint Petersburg.

=== Service in the Imperial Russian Army ===
Mannerheim planned a career at the prestigious Russian Imperial Guard, at the Chevalier Guard regiment of Her Majesty Empress Maria Feodorovna, but at first he was rejected. On 22 August 1889 he was hired as a cornet into the 15th dragoon regiment of Alexander's His Imperial Majesty Grand Duke Nikolai Nikolayevich the elder situated in Kalisz in Poland, which was not a guard regiment. Mannerheim was not happy with this situation, but dreamed of entry to the Chevalier Guard.

Finally an application by Mannerheim's godmother got the empress to accept him into the guard, but first he had to join the dragoons. Mannerheim served in Kalisz at the border of Poland and Germany from 1889 to 1890, until he was transferred to the Chevalier Guard in Saint Petersburg in 1891. In Saint Petersburg he married Anastasia Arapova, the wealthy heiress of a Russian major general on 2 May 1892. The marriage solved Mannerheim's financial problems which he had suffered from for his whole life. Mannerheim was the leader of the first group of the first troop of the regiment of the Chevalier Guard and in 1895 he started taking care of the regiment train. After a transfer to the highest court stables management the regiment's commander von Grünwald invited Mannerheim there to take care of the horses. Mannerheim was appointed to special duties at the court stables on 14 September 1897.

Mannerheim was not accepted to the academy for the general staff, and he remained as an expert of horses. In 1901 he was promoted to a captain in the cavalry. He bought horses for the army and had a horse breeding farm in the countryside. As a buyer of elite horses for the emperor he travelled all around Europe photographing horses. In his duties in the court stables he visited Germany, Austria-Hungary, Belgium and the United Kingdom.

Mannerheim's marriage to Anastasia Arapova practically ended in 1902 when the couple entered an unofficial separation in residence. From 1903 Mannerheim served as chief of the model troop and the director of horseriding teaching in the mounted regiments of the guard. He also made his name in competitive riding. By his own request, in 1904 Mannerheim was transferred to the officer riding school in Saint Petersburg where he was commanded to already in the previous year. His service as the chief of the model troop of the riding school was very significant for a future commander of the cavalry.

Mannerheim served in the Imperial Chevalier Guard until 1904. In 1896, he took part in the coronation of Emperor Nicholas II, standing for four hours in his full-dress Imperial Chevalier Guard uniform at the bottom of the steps leading up to the imperial throne. Mannerheim always considered the coronation a high-point of his life, recalling with pride his role in what he called an "indescribably magnificent" coronation. An expert rider and trained horseman, Mannerheim bought horses for the Russian army as one of his official duties. In 1903, he was put in charge of the model squadron in the Imperial Chevalier Guard and became a member of the equestrian training board of the cavalry regiments.

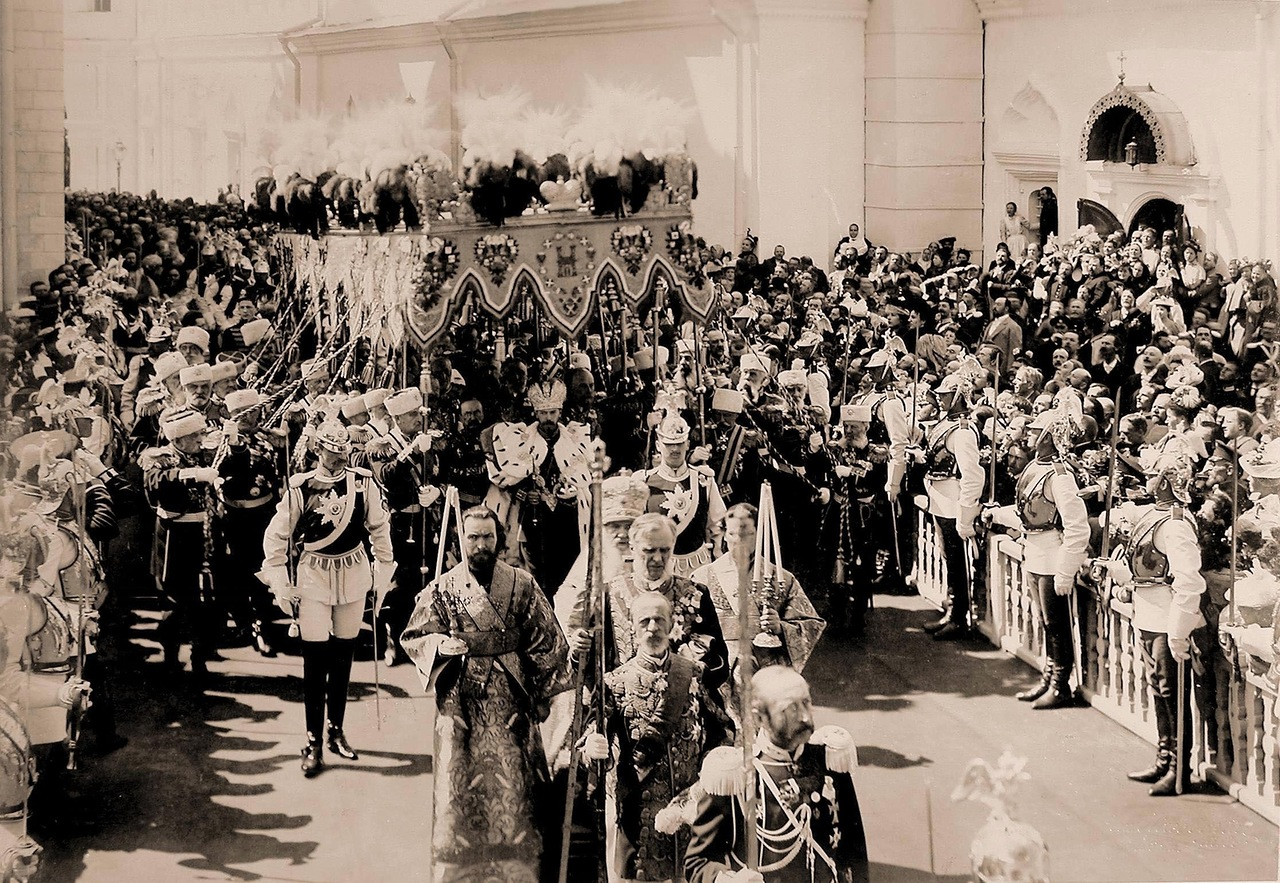
After his coronation, Nicholas II of Russia leaves Dormition Cathedral. The Chevalier Guard Lieutenant marching in front to the Tsar's left (to the viewer's right) is Mannerheim.

Mannerheim volunteered for active service with the Imperial Russian Army in the Russo-Japanese War in 1904. He was transferred to the 52nd Nezhin Dragoon Regiment in Manchuria, with the rank of Lieutenant-Colonel. During a reconnaissance patrol on the plains of Manchuria, he first saw action in a skirmish and had his horse shot out from under him. He was promoted to Colonel for bravery in the Battle of Mukden in 1905 and briefly commanded an irregular unit of Hong Huzi, a local militia, on an exploratory mission into Inner Mongolia. During the war, Mannerheim also managed to lead a group of local bandits with whom he sought the rear of the enemy to defeat them. Around the same time, Mannerheim's older brother, Carl Erik Mannerheim, who had been driven into exile during the first period of oppression, traveled to America and was involved in creating the center of the Finnish resistance movement in New York.

=== Journey to Asia ===
After returning from the Russo-Japanese war Mannerheim spent a little time in Finland and Sweden. As a representative of his family he took part in the 1905 Diet of the Estates in Helsinki from February to June 1905. This was the last Diet of the Estates in Finland.

Mannerheim, who had a long career in the Imperial Russian army, also rose to become a courtier of Emperor of all the Russias Nicholas II. When Mannerheim returned to Saint Petersburg, he was asked to undertake a journey through Turkestan to Beijing as a secret intelligence officer.

The Russian General Staff wanted accurate, on-the-ground intelligence about the reforms and activities by the Qing dynasty, as well as the military feasibility of invading Western China: a possible move in their struggle with Britain for control of inner Asia. The cover story for this intelligence-gathering operation was a scientific exploration together with the French archeologist Paul Pelliot. Disguised as an ethnographic collector, he joined Pelliot's expedition at Samarkand in Russian Turkestan (now Uzbekistan). They started from the terminus of the Trans-Caspian railway in Andijan in July 1906, but Mannerheim quarreled with Pelliot, so he made the greater part of the expedition on his own.

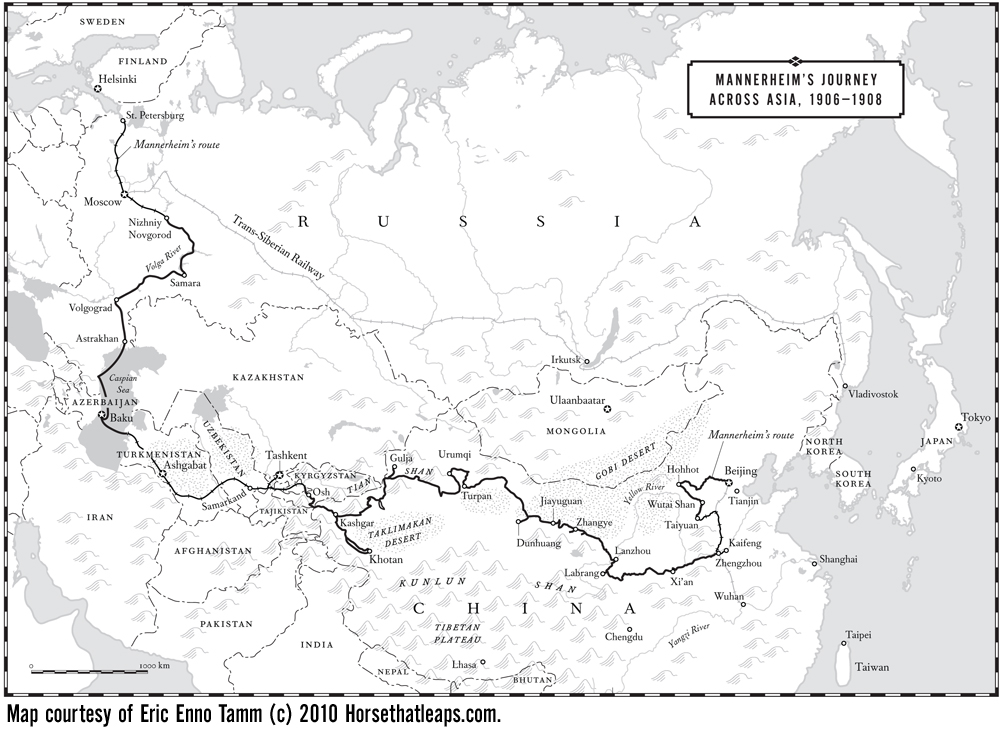
Gustaf Mannerheim's route across Asia from Saint Petersburg to Peking, 1906–1908.

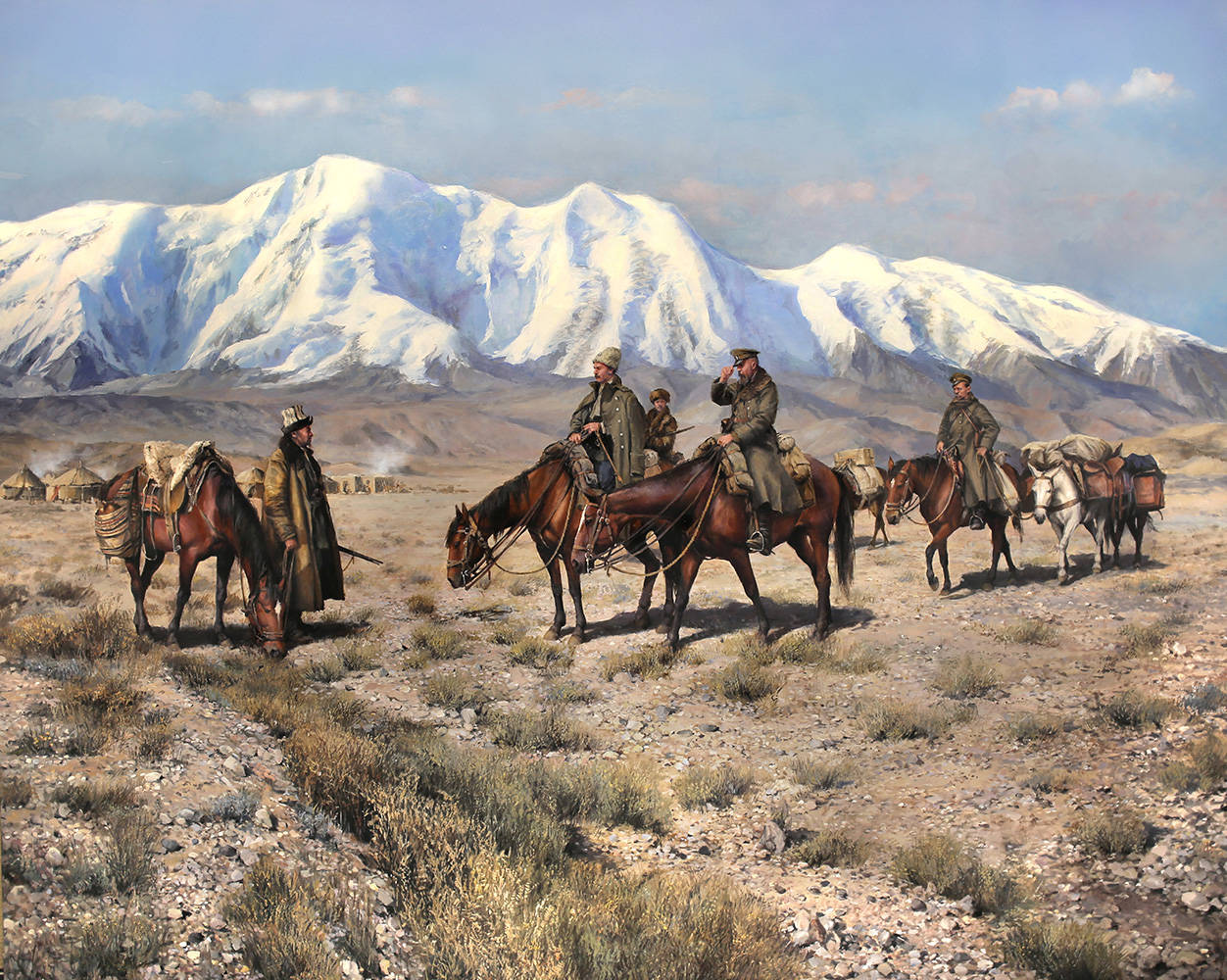
The expedition of Mannerheim

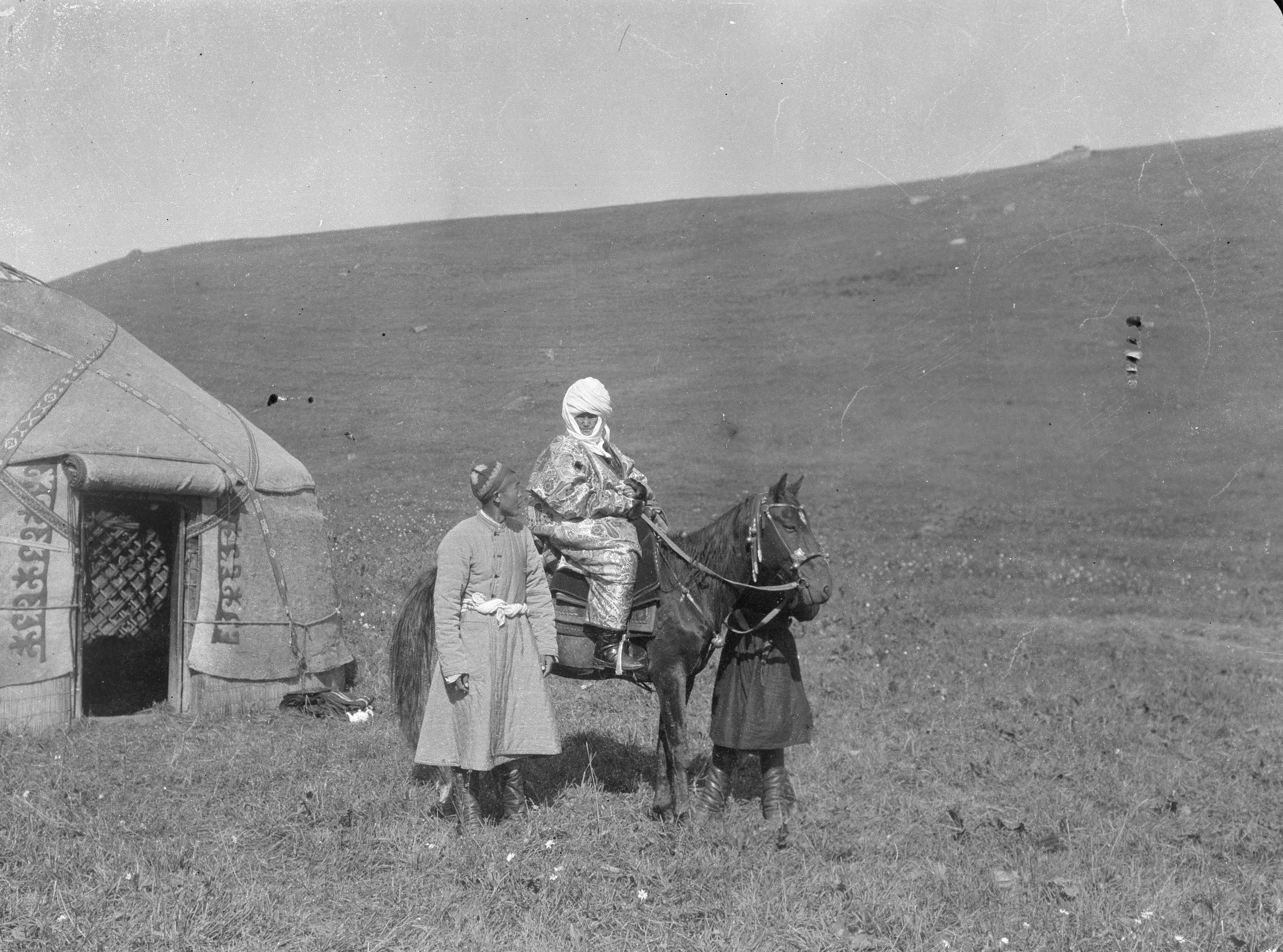
Kurmanjan Datka on horseback, photograph taken by Carl Gustaf Emil Mannerheim

Mannerheim undertook his journey through Asia to China on horseback. The total length of the journey was 14,000 kilometres and it took two years from 1906 to 1908. Mannerheim took his cover role seriously and collected a lot of ethnographic material from hitherto almost unexplored areas; thus the journey produced valuable geographical and ethnological research results. During his trip, Mannerheim demonstrated his ability in several languages, his knowledge of the world and his ability to network widely, in addition to which he was known for his systematicity, reliability and perceptiveness. Mannerheim also mastered the art of bribery with the locals to open their mouths.

Before his departure he had contacted the Finno-Ugrian Society where he had received a lot of instructions for scientific research. Kai Donner described him as an enlightened explorer. Mannerheim also became familiar with Marco Polo's notes as well as exploration stories written by Nikolay Przhevalsky, Sven Hedin and Marc Aurel Stein. He collected almost 1200 objects to the collection of the National Museum of Finland and took about 1500 photographs. The photograph he took of Kurmanjan Datka in Kyrgyzstan is used in the 50 Kyrgyz som banknote. Kurmanjan Datka was the ruler of Kyrgyzstan at the time when the country was annexed to Russia. In part 27 of the journal of the Finno-Ugrian Society Mannerheim published a linguistically significant paper A visit to the Sarö and Shera Yögurs. The most famous militarily significant result was the mapping of a road about 2000 kilometres in length.

With a small caravan, including a Cossack guide, Chinese interpreter, and Uyghur cook, Mannerheim first trekked to Hotan in search of British and Japanese spies. After returning to Kashgar, he headed north into the Tian Shan range, surveying passes and gauging the stances of the tribes towards the Han Chinese. Mannerheim arrived in the provincial capital of Ürümqi, and then headed east into Gansu province. At the sacred Buddhist mountain of Mount Wutai in Shanxi province, Mannerheim met the 13th Dalai Lama of Tibet, who was living in exile on Mount Wutai after the British had occupied Tibet. Mannerheim was only the third European to be granted an audience with the 13th Dalai Lama. Mannerheim and the Dalai Lama discussed Russia and the expenses of Mannerheim's journey to Asia. The Dalai Lama gave Mannerheim a white decorated cloth to give as a gift to emperor Nicholas II. In return, Mannerheim gave the Dalai Lama his pistol and showed him how to use it.

He followed the Great Wall of China, and investigated a mysterious tribe known as Yugurs. From Lanzhou, the provincial capital, Mannerheim headed south into Tibetan territory and visited Labrang Monastery, where he was stoned by xenophobic monks. Mannerheim arrived in Beijing in July 1908, returning to Saint Petersburg via Japan and the Trans-Siberian Express. His report gave a detailed account of Chinese modernization, covering education, military reforms, colonization of ethnic borderlands, mining and industry, railway construction, the influence of Japan, and opium smoking. He also discussed the possibility of a Russian invasion of Xinjiang, and Xinjiang's possible role as a bargaining chip in a putative future war with China. His trip through Asia left him with a lifelong love of Asian art, which he thereafter collected.

From Beijing, Mannerheim travelled to Japan and from there to Vladivostok, from where he returned to Saint Petersburg along the Trans-Siberian Railway. After returning to Russia in 1909, Mannerheim presented results of the expedition to Emperor Nicholas II. Mannerheim had originally planned to spend twenty minutes with the emperor, but the meeting lasted about an hour longer than that. Although the emperor thanked Mannerheim for the report, he failed to take advantage of its potential; Russia's attention had already begun to turn from China and Japan to Europe, where the atmosphere was beginning to tense on the eve of World War I.

There are many artifacts still on display in the museum. After that, Mannerheim was appointed to command the 13th Vladimir Uhlan Regiment in the Congress Kingdom of Poland. The following year, he was promoted to major general and was posted as the commander of the Life Guard Uhlan Regiment of His Imperial Majesty in Warsaw. Mannerheim recorded his journey to Asia in two books: A visit to the Sarö and Shera Yögurs and A journey through Asia. The latter book was originally published in Russian but has since been translated to numerous other languages and has attracted a great deal of professional attention.

Next Mannerheim became part of the Imperial entourage and was appointed to command a cavalry brigade.

=== World War I and the end of the Russian Empire ===
At the beginning of World War I, Mannerheim served as commander of the Separate Guards Cavalry Brigade (the 23rd Army Corps), and fought on the Austro-Hungarian and Romanian fronts. In December 1914, after distinguishing himself in combat against the Austro-Hungarian forces, Mannerheim was awarded the Order of St. George, 4th class. In March 1915, Mannerheim was appointed to command the 12th Cavalry Division.

Mannerheim received leave to visit Finland and Saint Petersburg in early 1917 and witnessed the outbreak of the February Revolution. After returning to the front, he was promoted to lieutenant general in April 1917 (the promotion was backdated to February 1915), and took command of the 6th Cavalry Corps in the summer of 1917. However, Mannerheim fell out of favour with the new government, who regarded him as not supporting the revolution, and was relieved of his duties. He retired and returned to Finland. Mannerheim kept a large portrait of Emperor Nicholas II in the living room of his house in Helsinki right up to his death, and when asked after the overthrow of the House of Romanov why he kept the portrait up, he always answered: "He was my emperor".

== Marriage and daughters ==
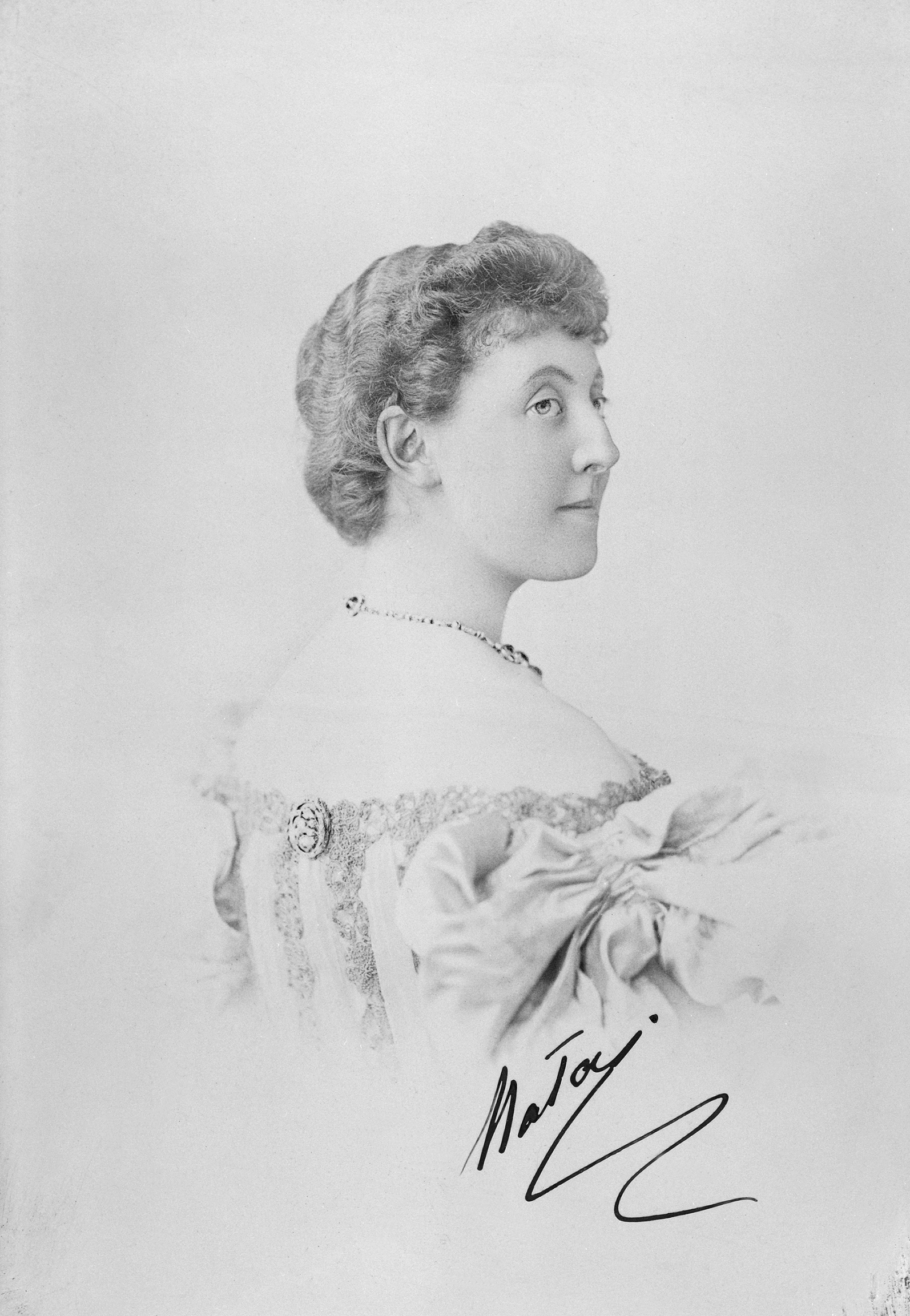
Anastasia Arapova, Mannerheim's wife, in 1896

In 1892 at the age of 25 Mannerheim married Anastasia Arapova (1872–1936), the wealthy heiress of a Russian major general of Russian-Serbian heritage. Anastasia was five years younger than Mannerheim. They were married in an Orthodox way at the Church of the Saints Zachary and Elizabeth and later again in a Lutheran way at the house of the privy councillor Ivan Zvegintsev.

The marriage opened Mannerheim's way to the social life in Saint Petersburg and solved his financial problems which he had suffered from for his whole life. The marriage resulted in two daughters: Anastasie "Stasie" (1893–1978) and Sophie "Sophy" (1895–1963). Another child, a son, was stillborn in summer 1894. The death of his son was a complete shock for Mannerheim.

Sophie spent periods in Finland and learned some Swedish. In 1919, when Mannerheim served as Regent, she took on the role of hostess at official functions, and also served as the general wreath-bearer at the grand promotion ceremony of the philosophical faculty that year.

In practice, Mannerheim's marriage ended in 1902 in an unofficial separation of residence. The marriage had been risky to begin with, as Mannerheim is said to have married the wealthy Anastasia under pressure from his family, and that he was really more interested in her little sister. After spending a year and a half as a military nurse in the service of the Red Cross in the Asian Far East Anastasia Mannerheim left her husband and moved to Paris, France with her daughters and in 1903 via China to the United States together with her children. Ten years later, both daughters came to Finland to live at their relatives, because their father was in Warsaw in Poland and could not take his daughters to live with him. Even though they were already practically separated, Mannerheim and Anastasia were not divorced as Anastasia feared a divorce would make her unwelcome to the social circles in Saint Petersburg.

Mannerheim only officially divorced his wife in 1919. The couple reconciled via letters in the 1920s. They met each other in 1936 in Paris where they reconciled face to face. Anastasia died soon afterwards. In his memoirs, Mannerheim devotes only one single sentence to his marriage and wife. After their parents' divorce, Anastasie and Sophie lived unmarried in the United Kingdom and in France.

Sophie lived with Alexandra "Alix" Demidoff-Depret-Bixio who had emigrated to France from Russia to whom she gave her inheritance until her death, while Anastasie briefly cohabited with her "petite amielle" the English Olive Rooney. She died alone in a nursing home.

Anastasia Arapova died on New Year's Eve 1936. This came as a shock to her daughters.

== Political career ==
=== The White General and the Regent of Finland ===
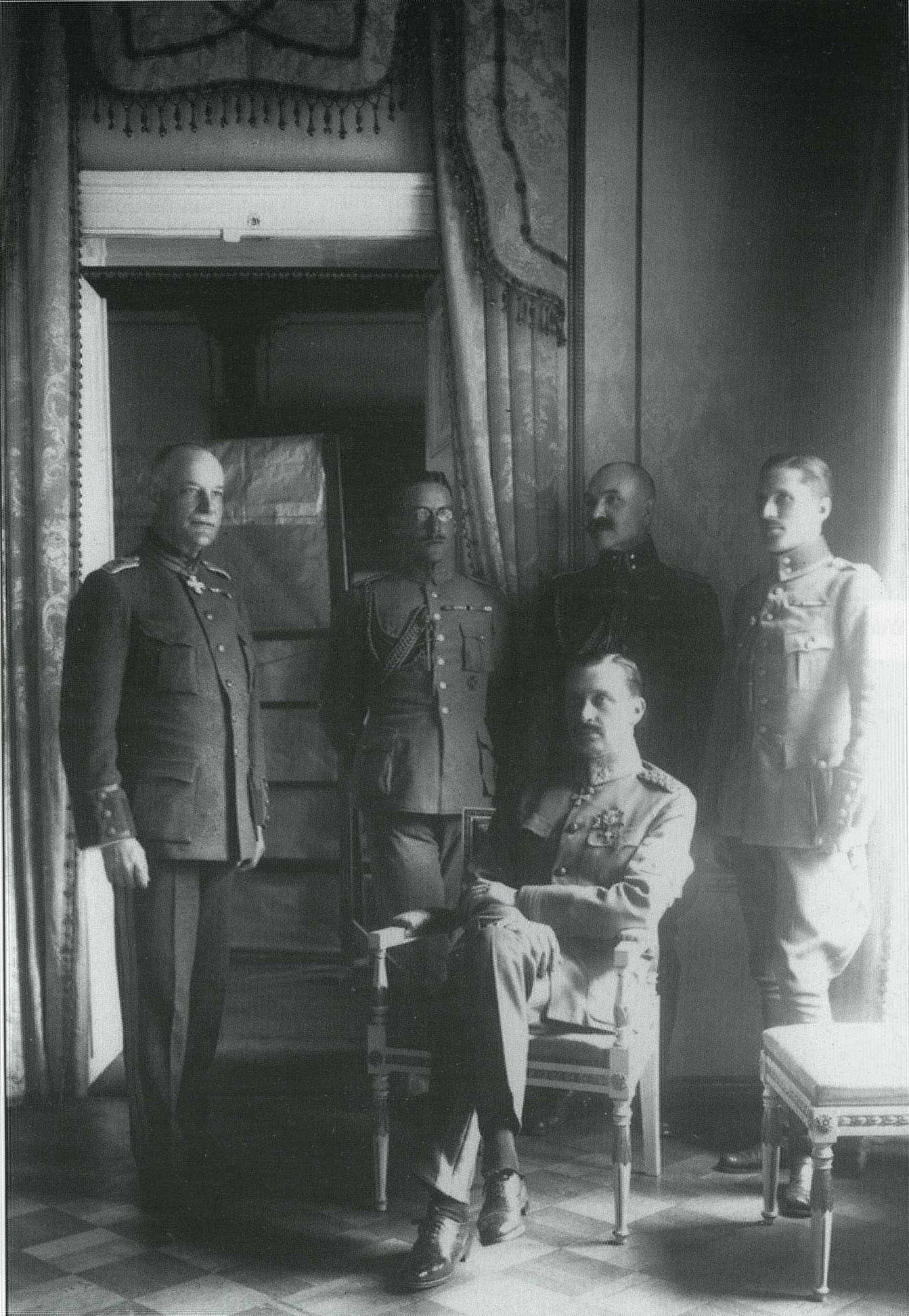
Mannerheim as Regent (seated), with his adjutants (left) Lt. Col. Lilius, Capt. Kekoni, Lt. Gallen-Kallela, Ensign Rosenbröijer.

In December 1917, Finland declared independence from Russia, now ruled by the Bolsheviks who had overthrown the Provisional Government in the October Revolution. The Bolsheviks accepted the secession for a variety of reasons, mostly because they could not control Finland; also, they hoped they could ultimately inspire a communist revolution there modeled after the Russian one. The Finnish parliament appointed P. E. Svinhufvud to lead the newly independent grand duchy's interregnum government. In January 1918, a military committee was charged with bolstering the Finnish army, then not much more than some locally organised White Guards. Mannerheim was appointed to the committee, but soon resigned to protest its indecision. On 13 January, he was given command of the army. He had only 24,000 newly enlisted, mostly untrained men. The Finnish Red Guard, led by communist leader Kullervo Manner and backed by Soviet Russia, had 30,000 men; there were also 70,000 Red Russian troops in Finland, but their participation in the war was limited. Mannerheim's army was financed by a fifteen million mark line of credit provided by the bankers. His raw recruits had few arms. Nonetheless, he marched them to Vaasa, which was garrisoned by 1,500–2,000 Soviet troops. (Note: More on this in occupation of Vaasa.) He surrounded the Russian garrison with a mass of men; the defenders could not see that only the front rank was armed, so they surrendered, providing badly needed arms. Further weapons were purchased from Germany. Eighty-four Swedish officers and 200 Swedish NCOs served in the Finnish Civil War (or "War of Liberty", as it was known among the "Whites"). Other officers were Finns who had been trained by the Germans as a Jäger Battalion. In March 1918 they were aided by German troops landing in Finland and occupying Helsinki.

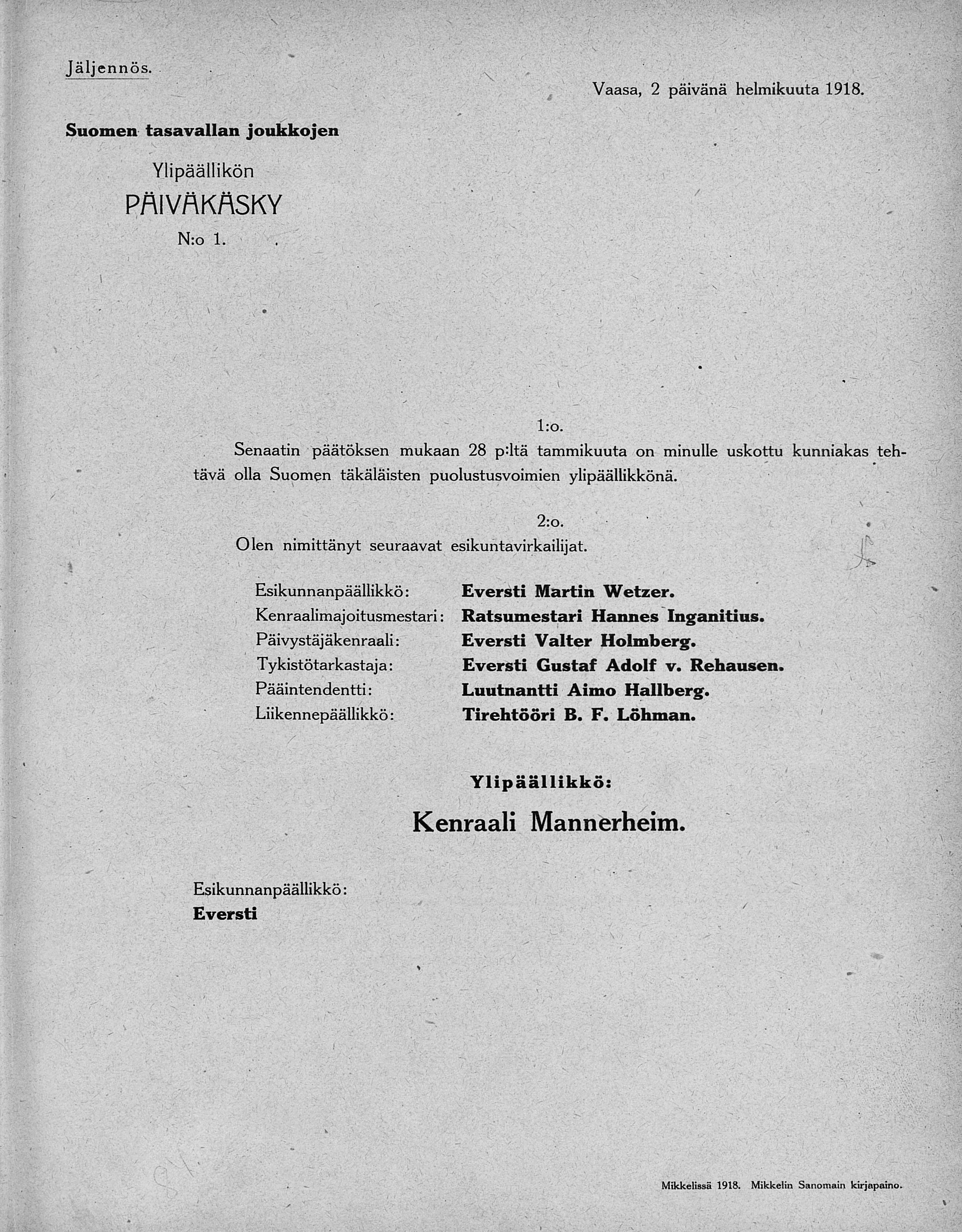
Mannerheim's Day Order No. 1 which established the first headquarters of the modern military of Finland on 2 February 1918

After the Whites' victory in the bitterly fought civil war, during which both sides employed ruthless terror tactics, Mannerheim resigned as commander-in-chief. He left Finland in June 1918 to visit relatives in Sweden. In Stockholm, Mannerheim conferred with Allied diplomats, emphasizing his opposition to the Finnish government's policy; Finnish leaders were confident the Germans would win the war, and had chosen Kaiser Wilhelm II's brother-in-law, Frederick Charles of Hesse, to be the King of Finland. In the meantime Svinhufvud served as the first Regent of the nascent kingdom. Mannerheim's rapport with the Allies was recognized in October 1918 when the Finnish government sent him to Britain and France to attempt to gain Britain's and the United States's recognition of Finland's independence. In December, he was summoned back to Finland; Frederick Charles had renounced the throne, and in his stead, Mannerheim had been elected Regent. As Regent, Mannerheim often signed official documents using Kustaa, the Finnish form of his Christian name, to emphasize his Finnishness to those who were suspicious of his background in the Russian armed forces and his difficulties with the Finnish language.

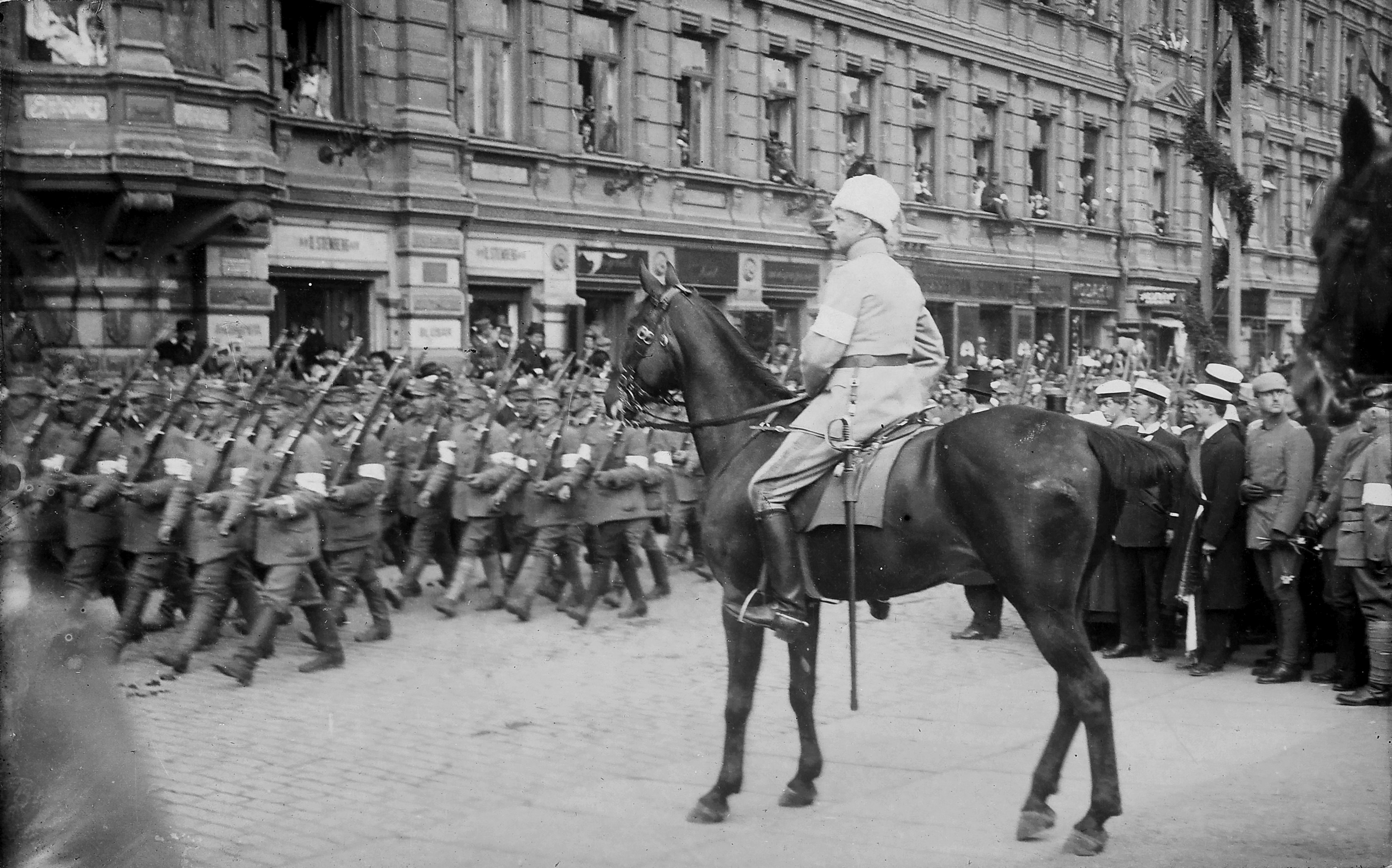
General Mannerheim leading the White Victory Parade in Helsinki, 16 May 1918

Mannerheim secured recognition of Finnish independence from Britain and the United States. In July 1919, after he had confirmed a new, republican constitution, Mannerheim stood as a candidate in the first presidential election, with parliament as the electors. He was supported by the National Coalition Party and the Swedish People's Party. He finished second to Kaarlo Juho Ståhlberg, and withdrew from public life.

==== Language skills ====
Mannerheim's mother tongue was Swedish. He spoke fluent German, French, and Russian, the last of which he learned serving in the Imperial Russian Army. He also spoke some English, Polish, Portuguese, Latin, and Chinese. He did not start learning Finnish properly until after Finland's independence in 1918, but never became fluent.

=== Interwar period ===
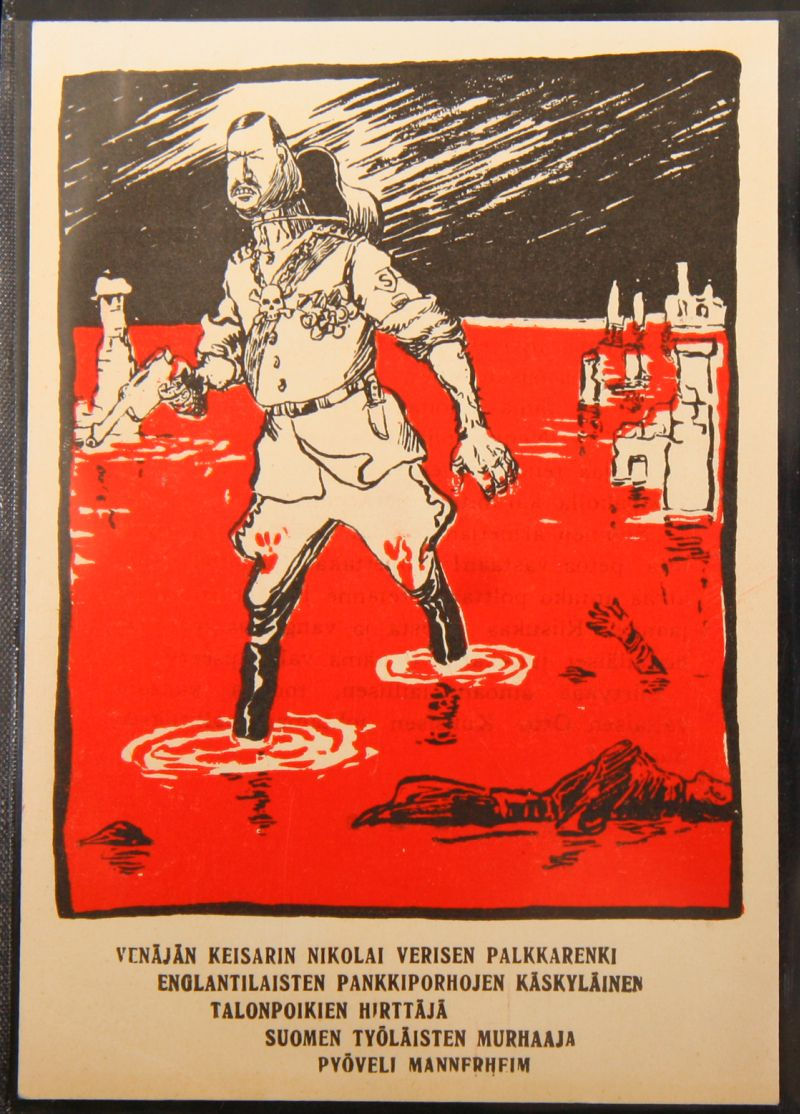
"Mannerheim the Executioner" (Pyöveli-Mannerheim); the caricature of Mannerheim from 1940 as part of communist and socialist propaganda is strong evidence of how Mannerheim heavily divided opinions, especially in the aftermath of the Civil War.

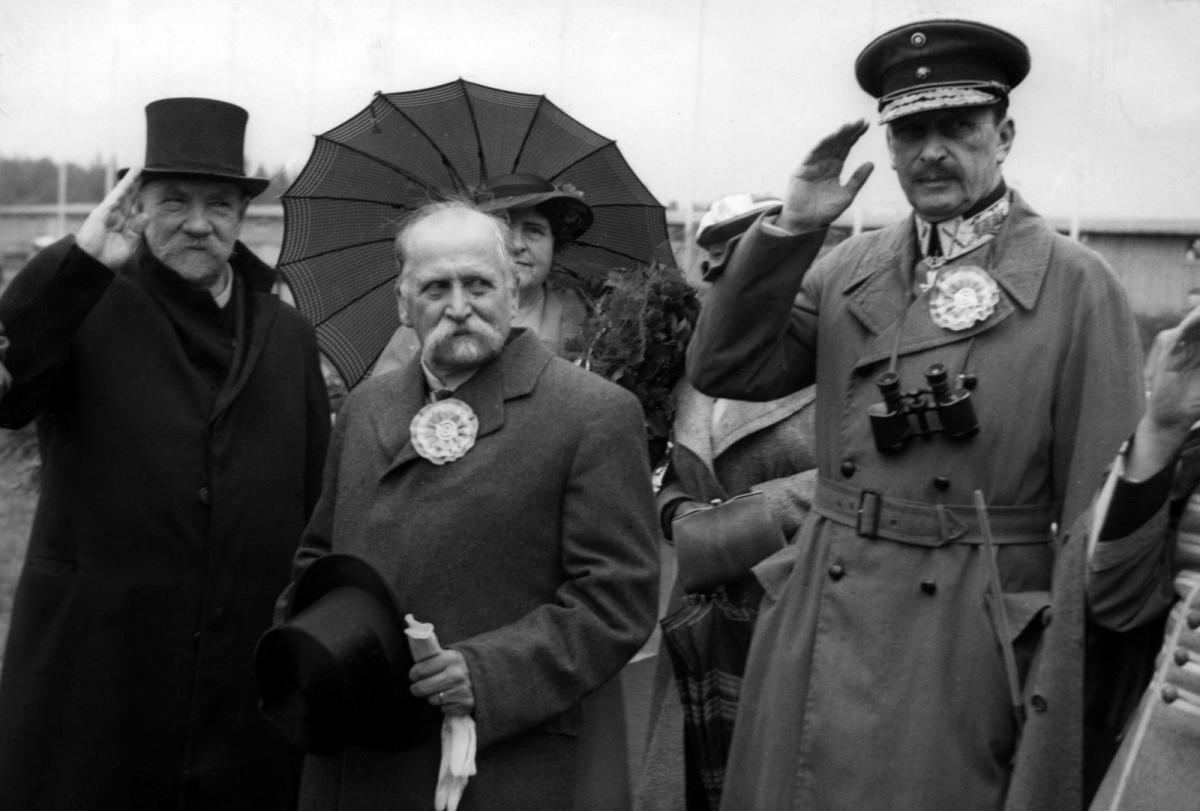
Svinhufvud, Kyösti Kallio and Mannerheim in 1937

In the interwar years, Mannerheim held no public office, mainly because he was viewed by many politicians of the centre and left as a controversial figure for his ruthless battle with the Bolsheviks, his supposed desire for Finnish intervention on the side of the Whites during the Russian Civil War, and the Finnish socialists' antipathy toward him. They saw him as the bourgeois "White General". Mannerheim doubted that modern party-based politics would produce principled and high-quality leaders in Finland or elsewhere. In his gloomy opinion, the fatherland's interests were too often sacrificed by the democratic politicians for partisan benefit.

After leaving his post as regent of Finland, Mannerheim spent his time on farming and was active in many communal duties. He kept busy heading the Finnish Red Cross (Chairman 1919–1951), was a member of the board of the International Red Cross, and founded the Mannerheim League for Child Welfare (Mannerheimin Lastensuojeluliitto). The foundation of the Mannerheim League for Child Welfare was possible with a sum of money collected through a petition in 1919. The sum amounted to 7.6 million markka (about 3 million euro in 2017). Mannerheim stayed as the honorary chairman of the Mannerheim League for Child Welfare up to his death. He was also the director of the central cabinet of the Finnish Red Cross from 1922 up to his death. He was the founder of the Red Cross Hospital and served as the director of its construction board.

Mannerheim respected the Scout movement and was awarded the first honorary membership of the Finnish Scouts Association in 1919. He was the honorary director of the association from 1941. He also founded the Mannerheim Buckle award on 15 February 1920. The inspiration for this award came from meeting the scouts on many of his official trips while he was serving as the regent of Finland. The award was designed by the Finnish artist Akseli Gallén-Kallela.

Mannerheim was also the chairman of the supervisory board of a commercial bank, the Liittopankki-Unionsbanken, and after its merger with the Bank of Helsinki, the chairman of the supervisory board of that bank until 1934, and was a member of the board of Nokia Corporation. He offered to serve the French Foreign Legion in the Rif War (1925–1926), but was turned down.

In the early 1920s Mannerheim had no interest to become involved in politics. A stark conflict between Mannerheim and president Ståhlberg kept Mannerheim away from government and defence duties. This caused some criticism. For example Rabbe Axel Wrede thought that the weakness of the democratic government was that Mannerheim's unquestionable abilities and hard-workingness were not being utilised for the good of Finland. A lack of demanding duties was troubling Mannerheim, and for a while he considered applying to the service of some other European power - such as France - as he was not given any duties in Finland.

In June 1921 president Ståhlberg dismissed the commander-in-chief of the Finnish White Guard Didrik von Essen because of the so-called White Guard Affair. The White Guard suggested Mannerheim as the new commander-in-chief. However, president Ståhlberg declined to confirm Mannerheim as the new commander-in-chief as he feared this would give Mannerheim too much power. Demonstrations and citizens' meetings were held in support of Mannerheim in Loviisa and Porvoo. President Ståhlberg ended up appointing the young Jäger lieutenant colonel Lauri Malmberg as the new commander-in-chief.

Mannerheim declined to appear as a candidate in the 1925 Finnish presidential election. As the "White General" Mannerheim enjoyed a great deal of prestige, which allowed him to be involved in matters related to the defence and the White Guard.

In the 1920s and 1930s, Mannerheim returned to Asia, where he travelled and hunted extensively. On his first trip in 1927, to avoid going through the Soviet Union, he travelled through the British Empire, going by ship from London to Bombay. From there he travelled to Lucknow, Delhi, and Calcutta in the British India. From there he travelled overland to Burma, where he spent a month at Rangoon and Mandalay. He then went on to Sikkim and returned to Finland by car and aeroplane.

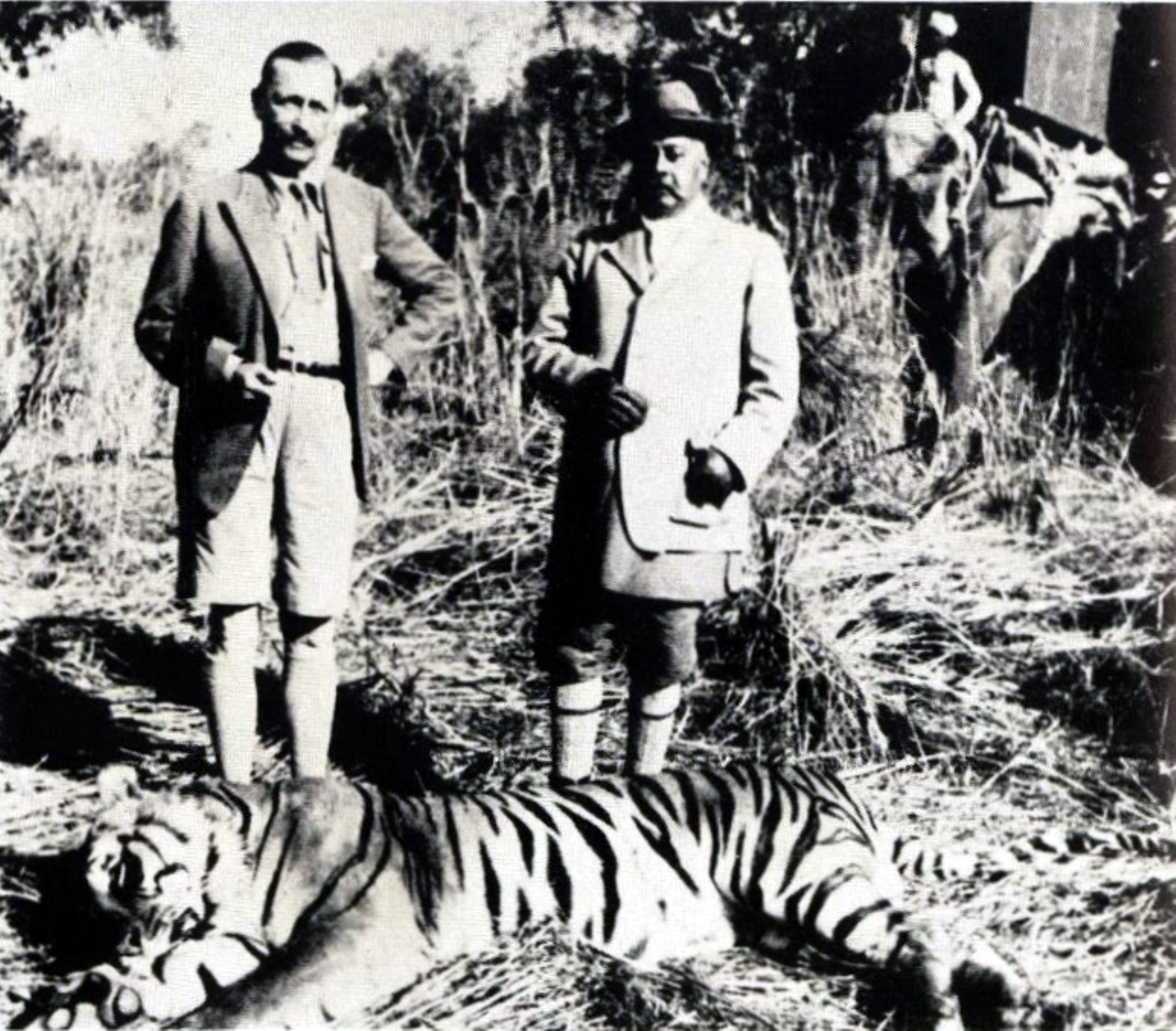
Mannerheim with Juddha Shumsher Jung Bahadur Rana on tiger hunt in Nepal in 1937

In his second voyage, in 1936, he went by ship from Aden (a British territory in Southern Arabia) to Bombay. During his travels and hunting expeditions, he visited Madras, Delhi and Nepal, where he was invited by the Rana Prime Minister Juddha Shumsher Jung Bahadur Rana to join a tiger hunt.

In 1936, Mannerheim represented the Finnish government at the funeral of King George V of the United Kingdom. On his way to the United Kingdom Mannerheim met the new king Edward VIII and talked with him about the commercial relations between Finland and the United Kingdom as well as the rising threat posed by Germany. King George VI awarded Mannerheim the Grand Cross of the Order of the British Empire in 1938.

In 1929, Mannerheim rejected a plea by right-wing radicals to become a military dictator. While he did express some support for the right-wing Lapua Movement, he distanced himself from the group after they became violent. After President Pehr Evind Svinhufvud was elected in 1931, he appointed Mannerheim as chairman of Finland's Defence Council and gave him a written promise that in the event of war he would become the Commander-in-Chief of the Finnish Army. (Svinhufvud's successor Kyösti Kallio renewed this promise in 1937).

In 1933, Mannerheim received the title of Field Marshal (sotamarsalkka, fältmarskalk). The title came with a substantial stamp duty of four thousand markka, equivalent of one month's pay of an army major, and by mistake, the bill was sent to Mannerheim himself. As Mannerheim was taking the money from his wallet he commented wryly: "It's a good thing they didn't make a bigger chief out of me." "Field marshal" was not an official military rank but instead a title presented to general of the cavalry Mannerheim. Even after being appointed field marshal he continued to appear as a general of the cavalry in the list of military officers in the Republic of Finland. Mannerheim was later appointed Marshal of Finland on his 75th birthday on 4 June 1942.

By this time, Mannerheim had come to be seen by the public, including some former socialists, less as a "White General" and more as a nonpartisan figure, enhanced by his public statements urging reconciliation between the opposing sides in the Civil War and the need to focus on national unity and defence: "we need not ask where a man stood fifteen years ago". Mannerheim supported Finland's military industry and sought in vain to obtain a military defence union with Sweden. However, rearming the Finnish army did not occur as swiftly or as well as he hoped, and he was not enthusiastic about a war. He had many disagreements with various Cabinets, and signed many letters of resignation.

==== 1920 assassination attempt ====
After their defeat in the Civil War, some Red Guards attempted to assassinate Mannerheim. One of the would-be assassins, Eino Rahja, was in charge of the Saint Petersburg International School of Red Officers.

Rahja began planning an assassination by assembling a group of eight Finnish Red Guards in Saint Petersburg for this purpose. The group included Aleksander Weckman, August Enroth, Aleksanteri Suokas, Karl (Kaarle) Salo, Väinö Luoto, Hjalmar Forsman, Emil Kuutti and Antti Pokkinen. The group was led by Weckman and he, Suokas and Salo were chosen as the actual assassins. They travelled to Helsinki under falsified passports in March 1920.

The attempt happened in April 1920 during a White Guard's parade on Hämeenkatu in Tampere, in which General Mannerheim was to participate. The group gathered on 3 April at the Park Café in Hämeenkatu; and at this stage, group member Karl Salo was designated as a shooter and given a Colt pistol. However, the assassination attempt failed due to Salo's hesitation. Salo's security detail in the crowd, consisting of Aleksander Weckman and Aleksanteri Suokas, who had been equipped with Walther and Colt pistols, lost sight of Salo and never had time to shoot Mannerheim either.

On 6 April, Weckman, the operation leader, threatened to kill Salo if he had not assassinated either Mannerheim or Bruno Jalander, the Minister of War and Uusimaa County Governor, within a week. This attempt was also unsuccessful, as Mannerheim and Jalander did not come to the Helsinki Conservation Party celebration after the authorities received a tip. Salo returned his pistol and escaped afterwards. Weckman and Suokas tried to escape to the Soviet Union with their two assistants but were arrested on the Helsinki-Vyborg train the night of 21 April. Salo was arrested in Espoo on 23 April.

The Helsinkian smith Teodor Sädevirta who had been assisting Weckman testified at the trial against the would-be assassins. As a revenge for this, the members who were still free organised a hand grenade attack against him on 26 August. The attack killed Sädevirta's bride. Of the remaining members of the group, Pokkinen, Forsman and Luoto escaped to Russia, but Enroth, who had organised the revenge attack, was arrested. Kuutti had already been arrested in Helsinki on 11 July. Both were sentenced to life in prison. Weckman and Enroth were deported to the Soviet Union in a secret prisoner exchange in June 1926. A group of policemen were rewarded with money for stopping the assassination attempt. Because of his testimony, Teodor Sädevirta was released and later worked as a smith in Kalvola. He died in 1958. It has been speculated that he could have been a police informant who had infiltrated the group.

Jari Tervo's historical novel Troikka (2008) is about a fictive version of the background of Mannerheim's assassination attempt.

=== Commander-in-Chief ===
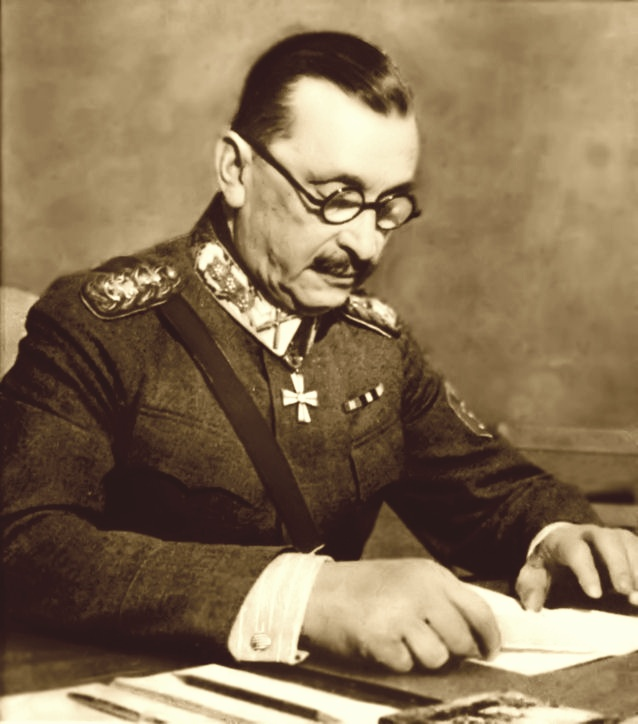
Field Marshal Baron Mannerheim in 1940

As chairman of the Finnish Defence Council, Mannerheim opposed war with the Soviet Union from the beginning. When the Soviets requested that Finland cede territory, he recommended that the Finnish government give into these demands, arguing that the Finnish Army was not strong enough to repel a Soviet attack. When negotiations with the Soviet Union failed in 1939, and aware of the imminent war and deploring the lack of equipment and preparation of the army, Mannerheim resigned from the military council on 17 October 1939, declaring that he would agree to return to business only as Commander-in-Chief of the Finnish Army. He officially became the supreme commander of the armies, at the age of 72, after the Soviet attack on 30 November 1939. In a letter to his daughter Sophie, he stated, "I had not wanted to undertake the responsibility of commander-in-chief, as my age and my health entitled me, but I had to yield to appeals from the President of the Republic and the government, and now for the fourth time I am at war."

Mannerheim addressed the first of his often controversial orders of the day to the Defence Forces on the day the war began:

The President of the Republic has appointed me on 30 November 1939 as Commander-in-Chief of the armed forces of the country. Brave soldiers of Finland! I enter on this task at a time when our hereditary enemy is once again attacking our country. Confidence in one's commander is the first condition for success. You know me and I know you and know that everyone in the ranks is ready to do his duty even to death. This war is nothing other than the continuation and final act of our War of Independence. We are fighting for our homes, our faith, and our country.

The defensive field fortifications they manned became known as the Mannerheim Line.

Field Marshal Mannerheim quickly organised his headquarters in Mikkeli. His chief of staff was Lieutenant General Aksel Airo, while his close friend, General Rudolf Walden, was sent as a representative of the headquarters to the cabinet from 3 December 1939 until 27 March 1940, after which he became defence minister. Within the Finnish military leadership, Marshal Mannerheim's position as Commander-in-Chief was entirely exceptional and highly centralized, but in practice, Airo and Mannerheim maintained a close working relationship, leading Airo to be widely regarded as "the Marshal's right-hand man" and the true brains behind General Headquarters.

Mannerheim spent most of the Winter War and Continuation War in his Mikkeli headquarters but made many visits to the front. Between the wars, he remained commander-in-chief. Although Mannerheim's main task was to lead the war, he also knew how to strengthen and maintain the will of the soldiers to fight. He was famed for this quote:

Forts, cannons and foreign aid will not help unless every man himself knows that he is the guard of his country.

Mannerheim kept relations with Adolf Hitler's government as formal as possible. Mannerheim did not really appreciate Hitler, even though he initially expressed an interest in his rise to power; his attitude towards Hitler turned negative at the point when Mannerheim's visit to Germany made him realize what kind of "ideal state" Hitler was building; he compared Hitler's rise in Germany to the 1917 rise of the Bolshevists in Russia. Before the Continuation War, the Germans offered Mannerheim command over 80,000 German troops in Finland. Mannerheim declined so as to not tie himself and Finland to Nazi war aims; Mannerheim was ready for cooperation and fraternity with Hitler's Germany, but for practical rather than ideological reasons because of the Soviet threat. In July 1941 the Finnish Army of Karelia was strengthened by the German 163rd Infantry Division. They retook the Finnish territories annexed by the Soviet Union after the Winter War, and went further, occupying East Karelia; Mannerheim had sworn that he would not rest until Karelia was re-incorporated into the "Greater Finland". Finnish troops took part in the Siege of Leningrad, which lasted 872 days.

On 20 June 1942, Mannerheim was inspecting Finnish front line troops in Poventsa when he and his staff were engaged by a Soviet anti-tank gun with direct fire. The first shell exploded at a spot where Mannerheim had just before entered a trench. He took cover in the trench until Finnish counter-battery fire neutralized the attacker. Captain Ahti Petramaa, section commander during the inspection, lost fingers from flying shrapnel and was escorted to an aid station where he was promoted to major by Mannerheim.

=== Visit by Adolf Hitler ===
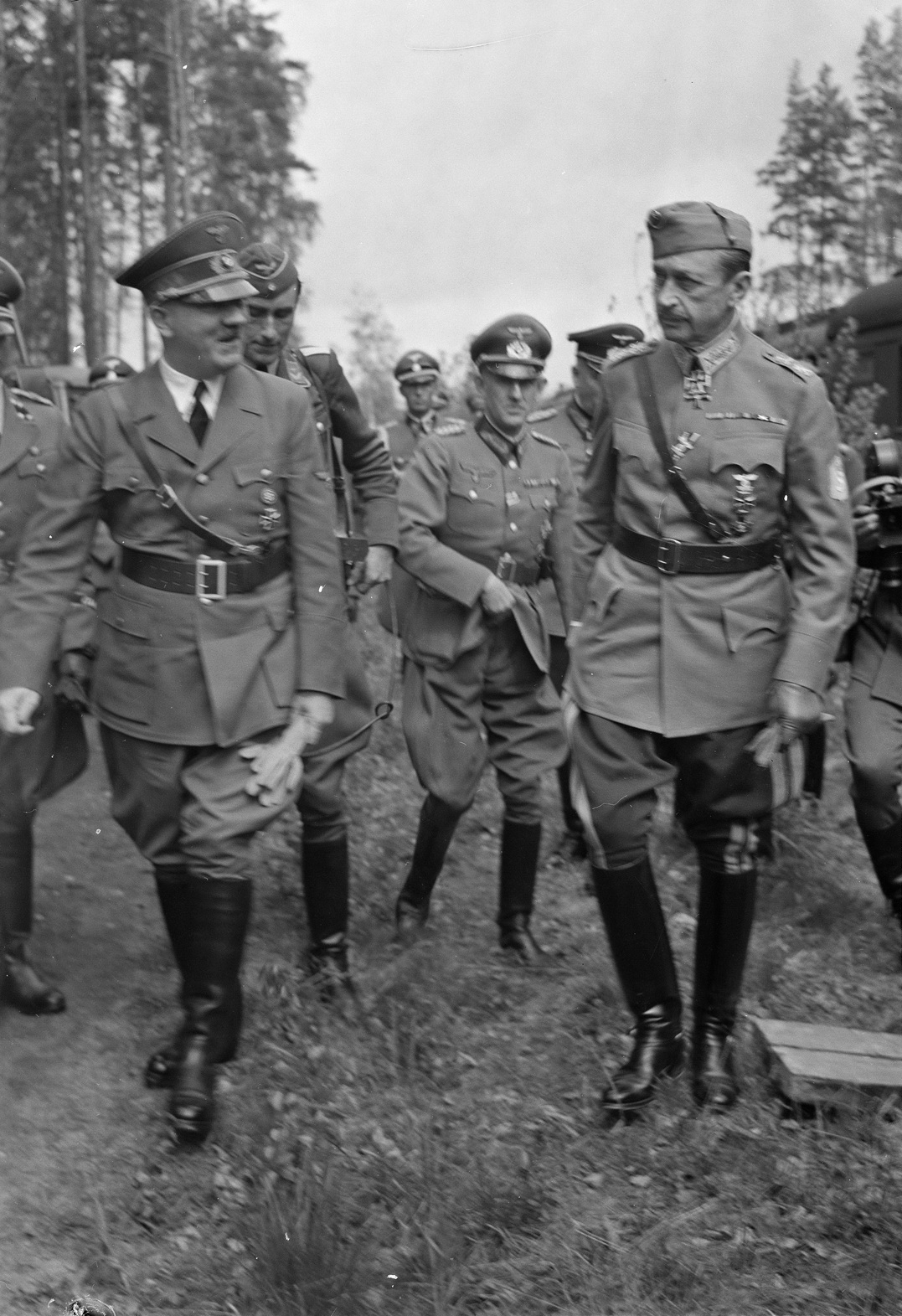
Adolf Hitler (left) and Mannerheim (right) on the Marshal's 75th birthday on 4 June 1942

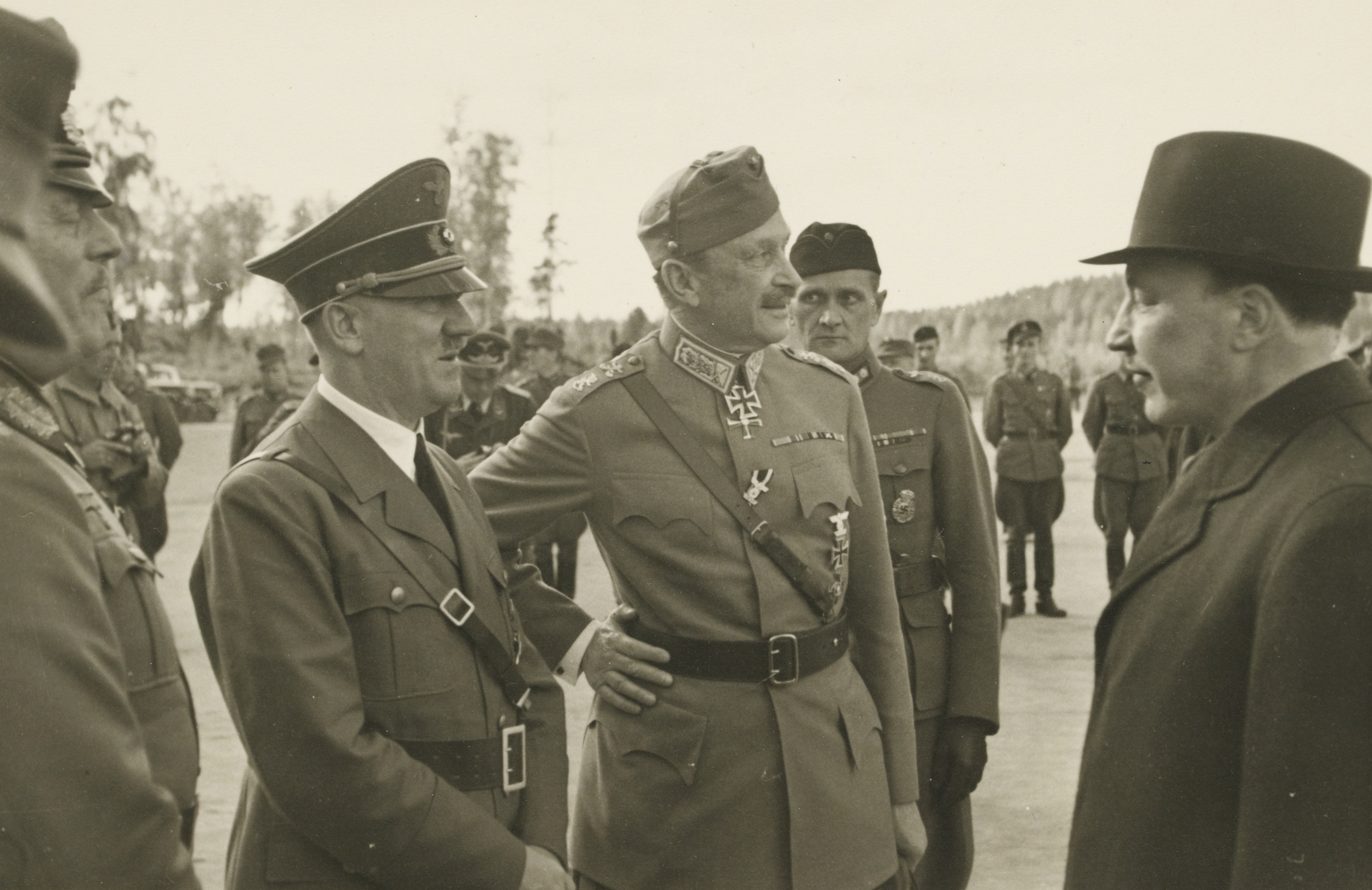
Discussion with Hitler, Marshal Mannerheim and President Ryti. Hitler visited Mannerheim on his 75th birthday.

Mannerheim's 75th birthday, 4 June 1942, was a national celebration. The government granted him the unique title of Marshal of Finland (Suomen Marsalkka in Finnish, Marskalk av Finland in Swedish). So far he is the only person to receive the title. 4 June was designated as the flag day of the Finnish Defence Forces and the street Heikinkatu in Helsinki was renamed as Mannerheimintie. Mannerheim's birthday was celebrated with many events both in the army and at the home front. The festivities emphasised the importance of the commander-in-chief as a nationally collective great man in difficult times. The Marshal himself would have wanted to celebrate his birthday as discreetly and modestly as possible. Of the congratulations he received, Mannerheim most liked the greeting from the trade union association describing the reuniting of the people.

A surprise birthday visit by Hitler occurred on the day as he wished to visit the "brave Finns (die tapferen Finnen)" and their leader Mannerheim. The news that Hitler would be arriving to visit Finland only arrived on the day previous to the visit, and ensuring the security of the high-ranking visitor required quick special arrangements. When president Risto Ryti telephoned Mannerheim and told him Hitler would be arriving, Mannerheim's first reply was "Vad i helvete gör han här?" (Swedish for: "What the bloody hell is he doing here?").

Mannerheim did not want to meet him at his headquarters or in Helsinki, as then it would seem like an official state visit. The meeting took place in a salon railway coach at the railway yard of the Kaukopää factory near Imatra, in south-eastern Finland, and was arranged in secrecy. From Immola Airfield, Hitler, accompanied by President Ryti, was driven to where Baron Mannerheim was waiting at a railway siding. Hitler gave Mannerheim a portrait of him painted by Karl Truppe as a gift. As well as Hitler and President Ryti, the entourage included Prime Minister of Finland Jukka Rangell, Ambassador of Germany to Finland Wipert von Blücher and Hitler's chief of staff field marshal Wilhelm Keitel. A speech from Hitler was followed by a birthday meal and negotiations between him and Mannerheim. Overall, Hitler spent about five hours in Finland; he reportedly asked the Finns to step up military operations against the Soviets, but apparently made no specific demands.

During the visit, an engineer of the Finnish broadcasting company Yleisradio, Thor Damen, succeeded in recording the first eleven minutes of Hitler's and Mannerheim's private conversation. This had to be done secretly, as Hitler never allowed off-guard recordings. Damen was assigned to record the official birthday speeches and Mannerheim's response and therefore placed microphones in some of the railway cars. However, Mannerheim and his guests chose to go to a car that did not have a microphone in it. Damen acted quickly, pushing a microphone through one of the car windows onto a net shelf just above where Hitler and Mannerheim were sitting. After eleven minutes of Hitler's and Mannerheim's private conversation, Hitler's SS bodyguards spotted the cords coming out of the window and realized that the Finnish engineer was recording the conversation. They gestured to him to stop recording immediately, and he complied. The SS bodyguards demanded that the tape be destroyed, but Yleisradio was allowed to keep the reel after promising to keep it in a sealed container. It was given to Kustaa Vilkuna, head of the state censors' office, and in 1957 returned to Yleisradio. It was released to the public a few years later. It is the only known recording of Hitler speaking outside of a formal occasion.

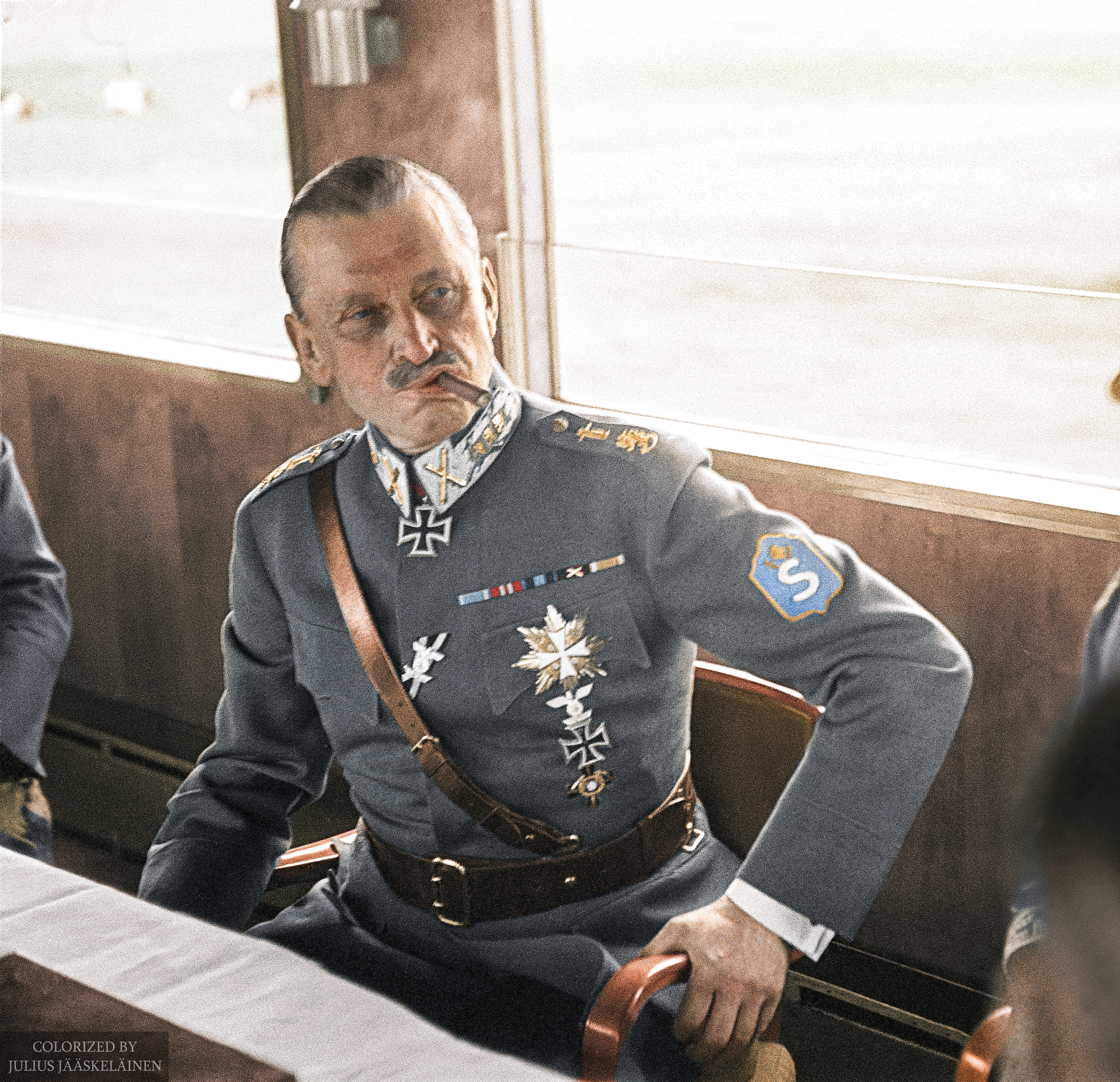
Marshal of Finland Carl Gustaf Emil Mannerheim visit in Germany, 1942

There is an unsubstantiated story that while conversing with Hitler, Mannerheim lit a cigar. Mannerheim expected that Hitler would ask Finland for more help against the Soviet Union, which Mannerheim was unwilling to give. When Mannerheim lit up, all in attendance gasped, for Hitler's aversion to smoking was well known. Nevertheless, Hitler continued the conversation calmly, with no comment. By this test, Mannerheim could judge if Hitler was speaking from a position of strength or weakness. He refused Hitler, knowing that Hitler was in a weak position, and could not dictate to him.

Shortly thereafter, Mannerheim returned the visit, travelling to Hitler's headquarters in East Prussia.

=== End of war and presidency ===
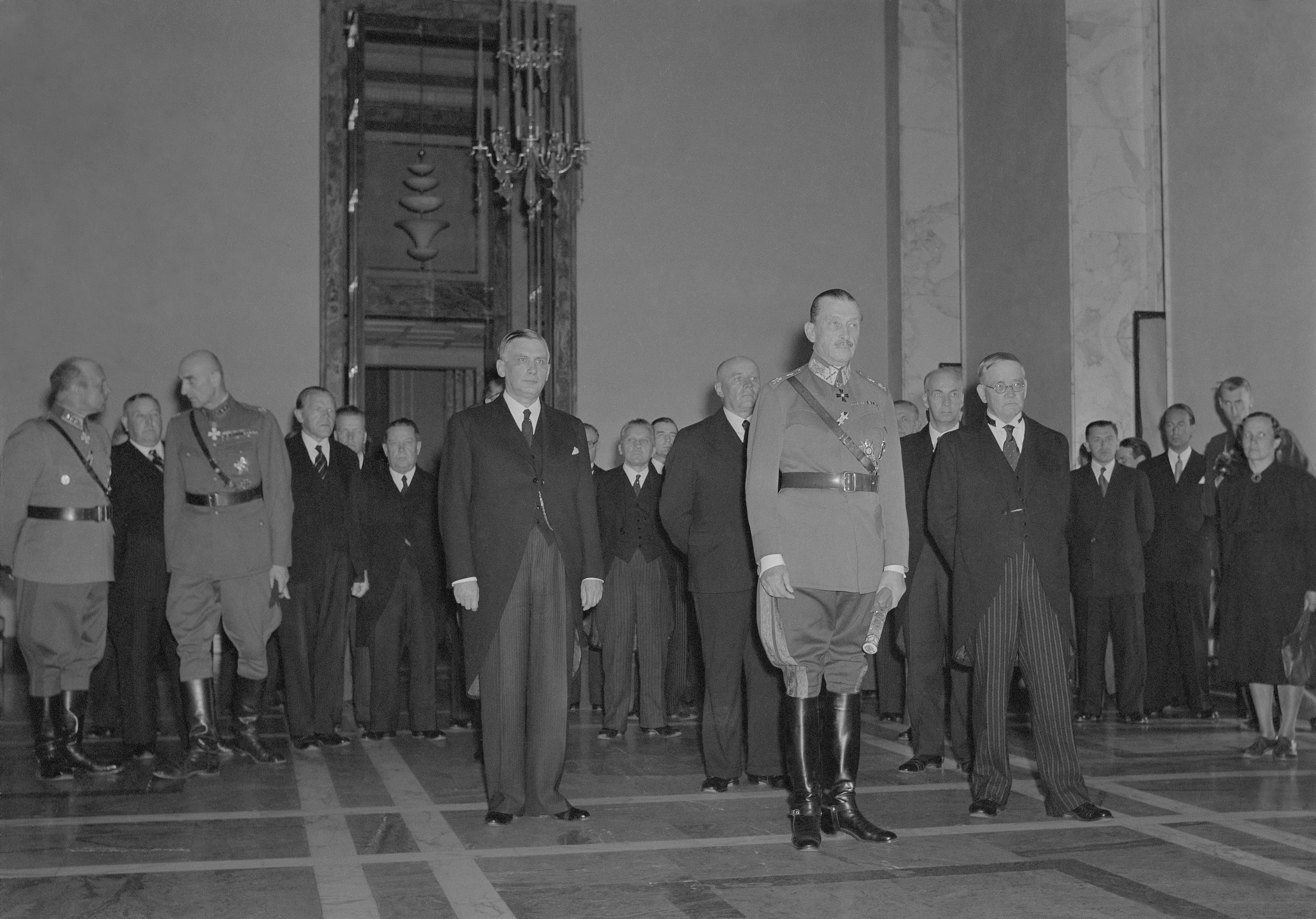
Mannerheim was elected president by an emergency law passed by parliament in early August 1944

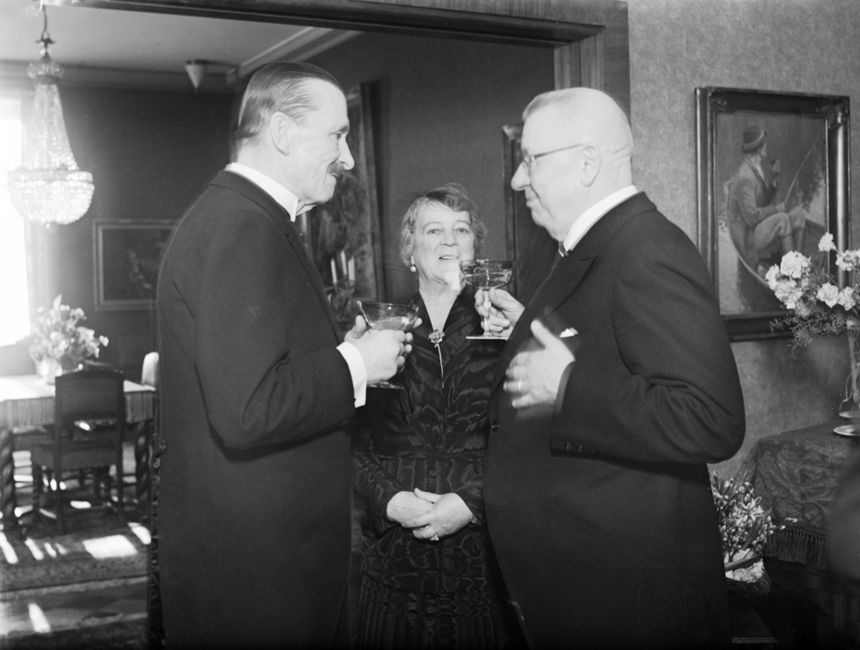
Mannerheim with his presidential successor J. K. Paasikivi (right) and his wife Alli Paasikivi in March 1946.

In June 1944, Baron Gustaf Mannerheim, to ensure German support while a major Soviet offensive was threatening Finland, thought that it was necessary to agree to the pact the German Foreign Minister Joachim von Ribbentrop demanded. But even then Mannerheim distanced himself from the pact, and it fell to President Risto Ryti to sign it, so it came to be known as the Ryti-Ribbentrop Agreement. This allowed Mannerheim to revoke the agreement upon the resignation of President Ryti at the start of August 1944. Mannerheim succeeded Ryti as president.

When Germany was deemed sufficiently weakened, and the USSR's summer offensive was fought to a standstill (see Battle of Tali-Ihantala) thanks to the June agreement with the Germans, Finland's leaders saw a chance to reach a peace with the Soviet Union. At first, attempts were made to persuade Mannerheim to become prime minister, but he rejected them because of his age and lack of experience running a civil government. The next suggestion was to elect him head of state. Risto Ryti would resign as president, and parliament would appoint Mannerheim as regent. The use of the title regent would have reflected the exceptional circumstances of Mannerheim's election. Mannerheim and Ryti both agreed, and Ryti submitted a notice of resignation on 1 August. The Parliament of Finland passed a special act conferring the presidency on Mannerheim on 4 August 1944. He took the oath of office the same day. Mannerheim initially hesitated to accept the presidency, both because of his poor health and because he disliked politics. He nonetheless concluded that he was the only candidate at that moment whom the United States, Britain and the Soviet Union would accept. After delivering his oath of office, Mannerheim was so exhausted that he dropped his marshal's baton on his way out of parliament.

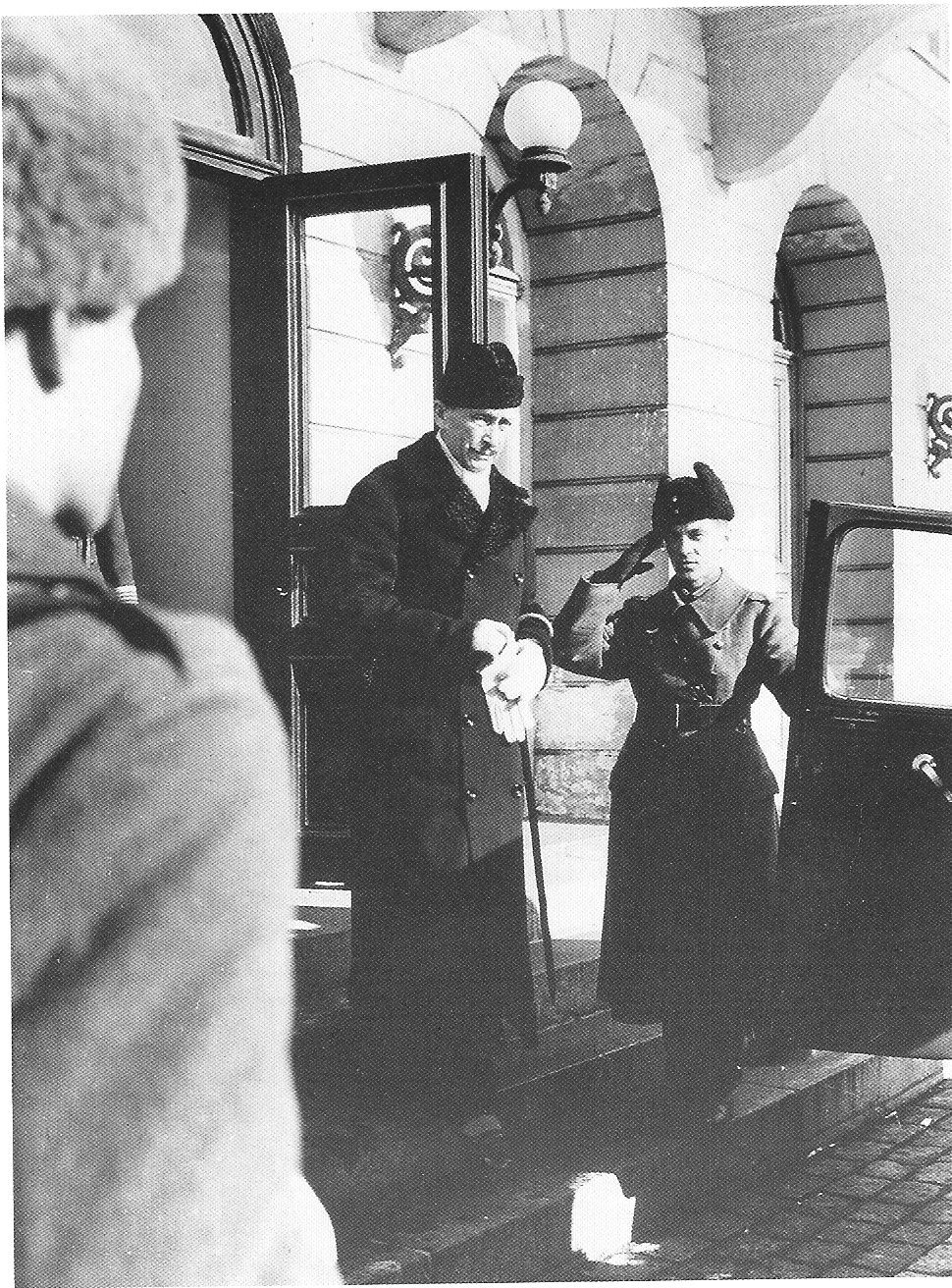
Marshal Baron Mannerheim leaves the Presidential Palace in Helsinki on 4 March 1946 after his short presidency

A month after Mannerheim took office, the Continuation War was concluded on harsh terms, but ultimately far less harsh than those imposed on the other states bordering the Soviet Union. Finland retained its sovereignty, its parliamentary democracy, and its market economy. Territorial losses were considerable; a portion of Karelia and all Petsamo were lost. Numerous Karelian refugees needed to be relocated. The war reparations were very heavy. Finland also had to fight the Lapland War against withdrawing German troops in the north, and at the same time demobilize its own army, making it harder to expel the Germans; Mannerheim appointed Lieutenant General Hjalmar Siilasvuo as the high commander of the army to take this action. It is widely agreed that only Mannerheim could have guided Finland through these difficult times, when the Finnish people had to come to terms with the severe conditions of the armistice, their implementation by a Soviet-dominated Allied Control Commission, and the task of post-war reconstruction.

Before deciding to accept the Soviet demands, Mannerheim wrote a missive directly to Hitler:

Our German brothers-in-arms will forever remain in our hearts. The Germans in Finland were certainly not the representatives of foreign despotism but helpers and brothers-in-arms. But even in such cases foreigners are in difficult positions requiring such tact. I can assure you that during the past years nothing whatsoever happened that could have induced us to consider the German troops intruders or oppressors. I believe that the attitude of the German Army in northern Finland towards the local population and authorities will enter our history as a unique example of a correct and cordial relationship ... I deem it my duty to lead my people out of the war. I cannot and I will not turn the arms which you have so liberally supplied us against Germans. I harbour the hope that you, even if you disapprove of my attitude, will wish and endeavour like myself and all other Finns to terminate our former relations without increasing the gravity of the situation.

Hitler received the news with unusual calm, commenting only: "Bah, that Mannerheim is an excellent soldier but a poor politician." The German press was similarly mild in its treatment of Finland.

Mannerheim's term as president was difficult for him. Although he was appointed for a full six-year term, he was 77 years old in 1944 and had accepted the office reluctantly after being urged to do so. The situation was exacerbated by frequent periods of ill-health, the demands of the Allied Control Commission, and the war responsibility trials. He was afraid throughout most of his presidency that the commission would request his prosecution for crimes against peace. This never happened. One of the reasons for this was Stalin's respect for and admiration of the Marshal. Stalin told a Finnish delegation in Moscow in 1947 that the Finns owed much to their old Marshal. Due to Mannerheim, Finland was not occupied. Despite Mannerheim's criticisms of some of the demands of the Control Commission, he worked hard to carry out Finland's armistice obligations. He also emphasised the necessity of further work on reconstruction in Finland after the war.

Mannerheim was troubled by recurring health problems during 1945, and was absent on medical leave from his duties as president from November until February 1946. He spent six weeks in Portugal to restore his health. After the announcement of the verdicts in the war crimes trials in February, Mannerheim decided to resign. He believed that he had accomplished the duties he had been elected to carry out: the war was ended, the armistice obligations carried out, and war responsibility trials finished.

Mannerheim resigned as president on 4 March 1946, giving as his reason his declining health and his view that the tasks he had been selected to carry out had been accomplished. He was succeeded as president by the conservative Prime Minister J. K. Paasikivi.

== Final days and death ==
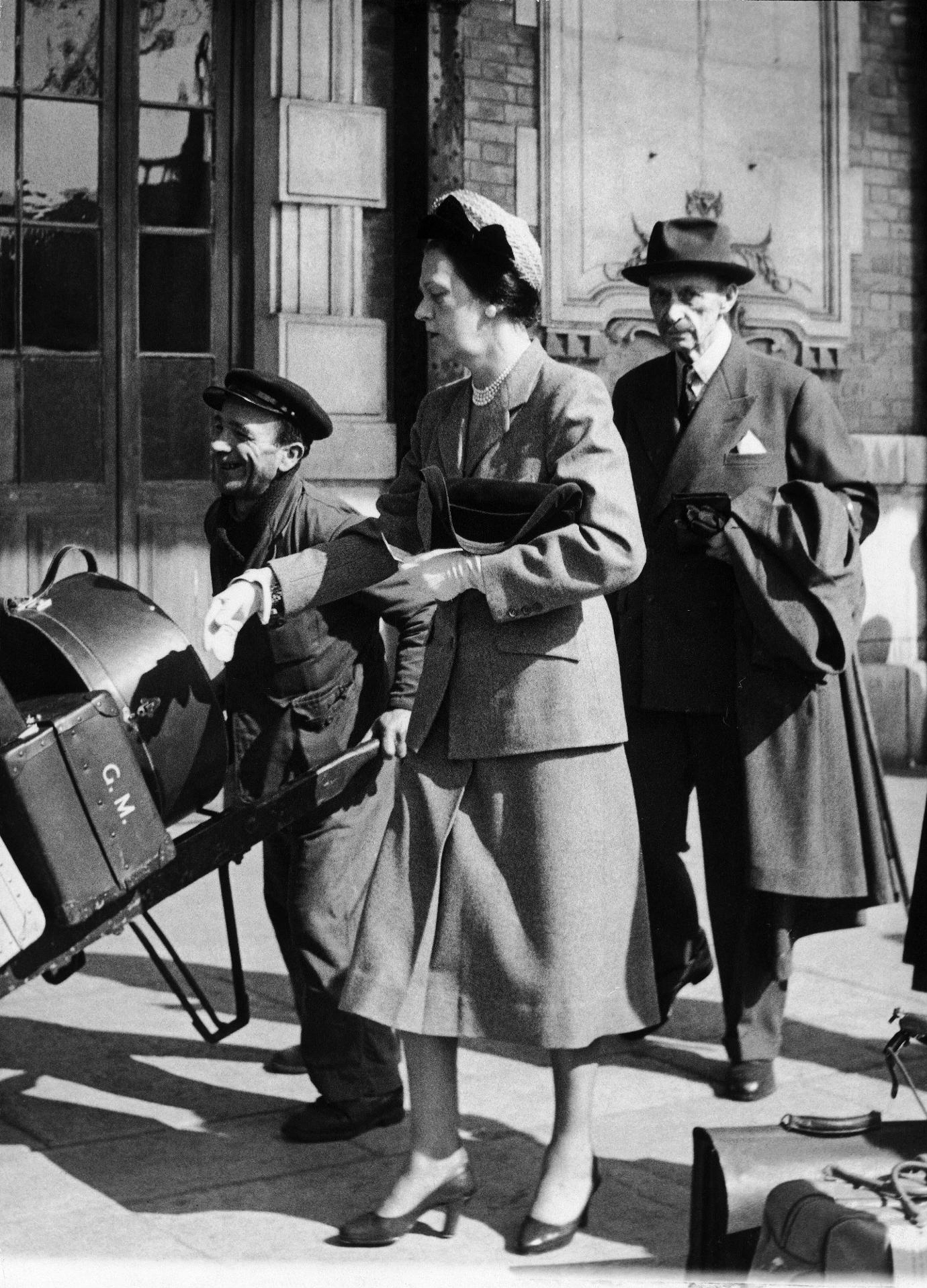
Mannerheim (right) with his friend, countess Gertrud Arco auf Valley née Wallenberg (1895–1983) at Nice, France in April 1950.

Even during his presidency Marshal Baron Mannerheim had been a sick man. After he had become sure he would not be found guilty of war crimes at the war-responsibility trials in Finland, the sickly Mannerheim resigned from his duties as President of Finland at the age of 78 in March 1946. He spent most of his retirement years abroad. In 1946, Mannerheim bought Kirkniemi Manor in Lohja, intending to spend his retirement there. He was the fourth marshal to have lived in the manor. In June 1946, he underwent an operation for a perforated peptic ulcer, and in October of that year he was diagnosed with a duodenal ulcer. The ulcer developed suddenly in June 1946 when he was visiting Jakobstad. The difficult operation was performed by the doctor Runar C. Öhman. In early 1947, it was recommended that he should travel to the Valmont Sanatorium in Montreux, Switzerland, to recuperate and write his memoirs. Valmont was to be Mannerheim's main residence for the remainder of his life, although he regularly returned to Finland, and also visited Sweden, France and Italy.

Because Mannerheim was old and sickly, he personally wrote only certain passages of his memoirs. He dictated some other parts. The remaining parts were written from his recollections by Mannerheim's various assistants, such as Colonel Aladár Paasonen; General Erik Heinrichs; Generals Grandell, Olenius and Martola; and Colonel Viljanen, a war historian. As long as Mannerheim was able to read, he proofread the typewritten drafts of his memoirs. He was almost totally silent about his private life, and focused instead on Finland's history, especially between 1917 and 1944. When Mannerheim suffered a fatal bowel obstruction in January 1951, his memoirs were not yet in their finished form. They were published after his death.

In 1948 Mannerheim underwent another major surgery, this time in Stockholm. For a few years, the surgery yielded good results. In January 1951 Mannerheim had a serious peptic ulcer case and on 23 January he was taken to the Cantonal Hospital in Lausanne (French: L'Hôpital cantonal à Lausanne; modern Lausanne University Hospital), Switzerland.

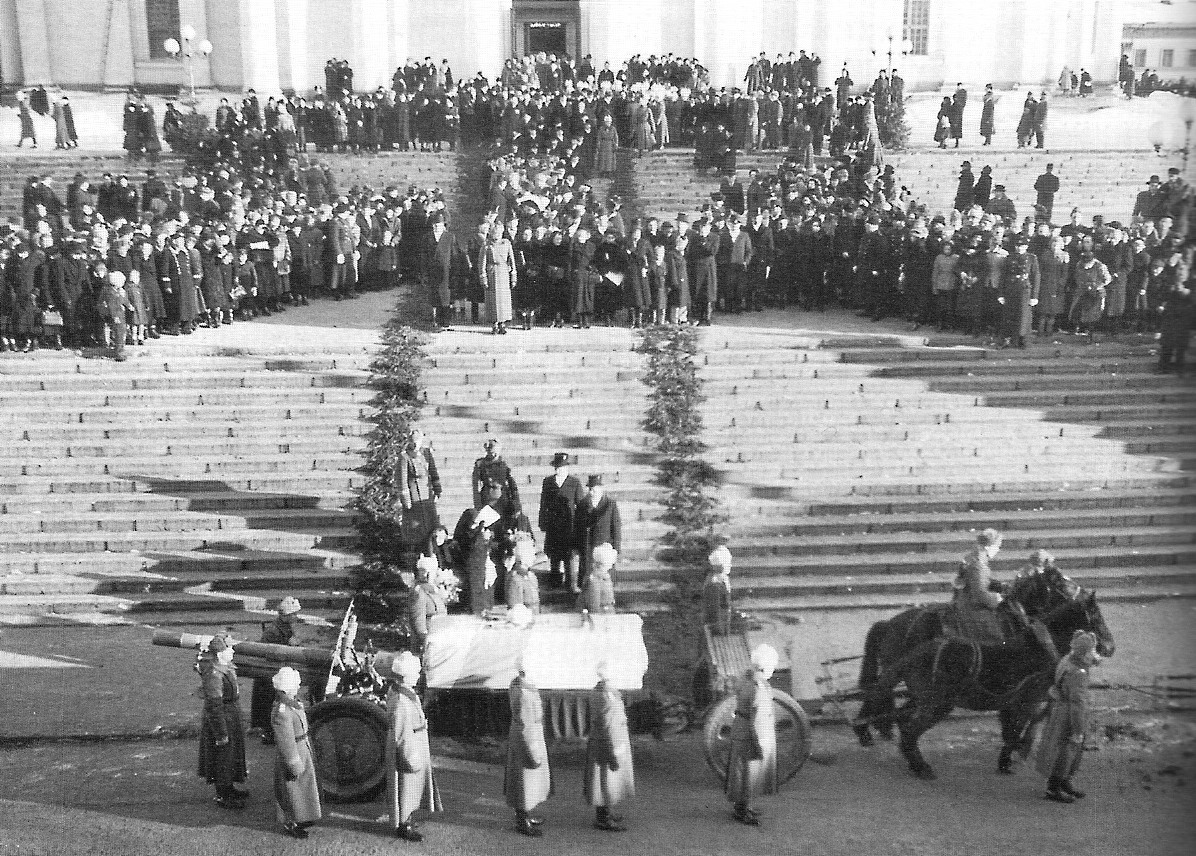
Mannerheim's funeral parade in Helsinki Senate Square on 4 February 1951.

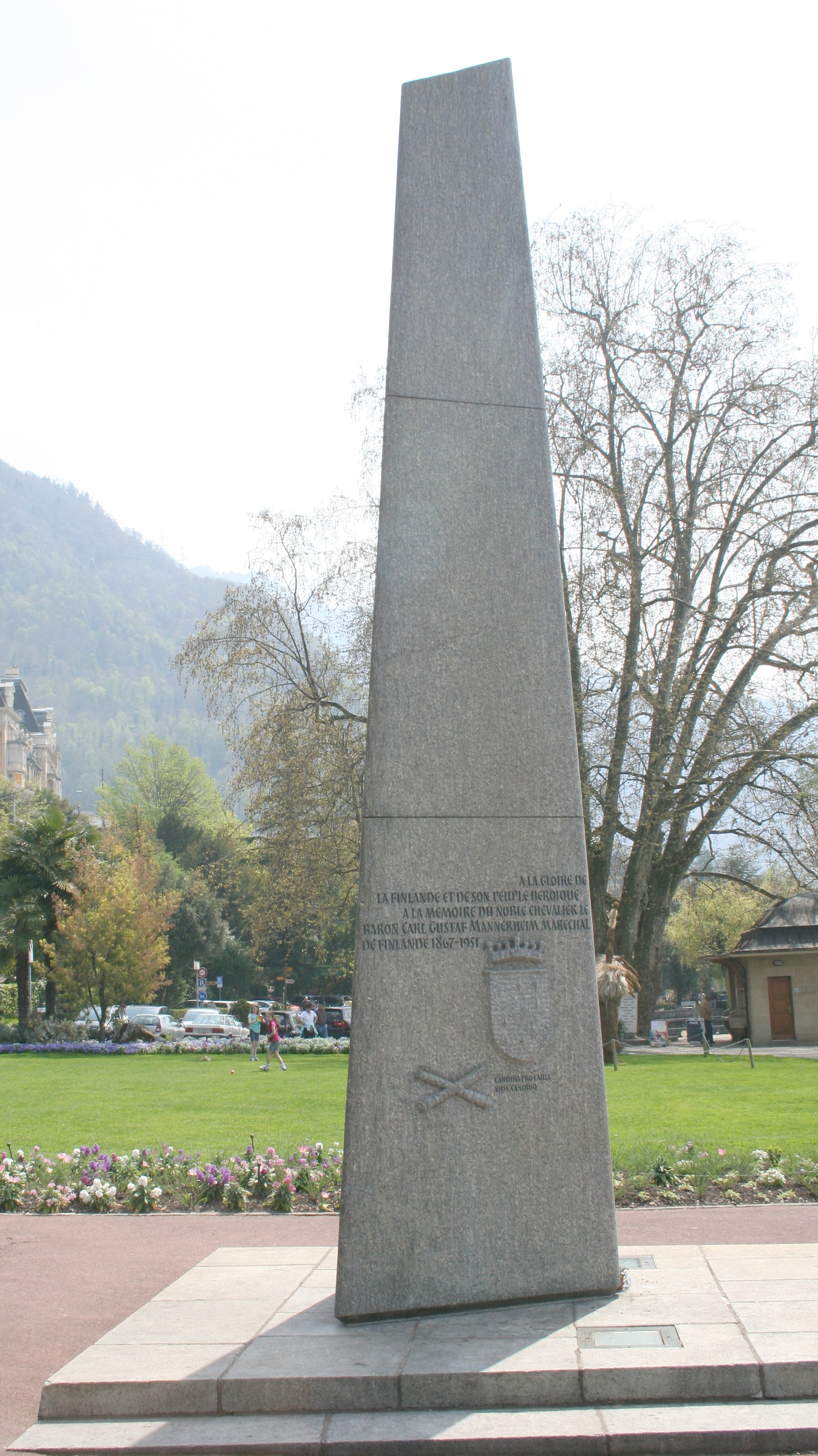
Monument to Mannerheim in Montreux, Switzerland, next to Lake Geneva

Mannerheim died on 27 January 1951 (28 January Finnish time), in the Cantonal Hospital. At the Marshal's bedside in his last moments were his Swedish personal physician Nanna Svartz, his adjutant Colonel Olof Lindeman, and the Envoy of Finland to Bern, Reinhold Svento. When the news of Mannerheim's death reached Finland, President J. K. Paasikivi told the Finnish people on the radio about his death, saying that "one of the greatest men and most brilliant figures in Finnish history had left us".

Mannerheim's coffin arrived at Helsinki-Malmi Airport on 2 February, after which the public had the opportunity to visit Helsinki Cathedral to pay their respects for two days. He was buried on 4 February 1951 in the Hietaniemi Cemetery in Helsinki in a state funeral with full military honours. Prime Minister Urho Kekkonen and Foreign Minister Åke Gartz attended the funeral as representatives of the government, and the State's greetings to the late Marshal were presented by the Speaker of Parliament K. A. Fagerholm. The funeral procession was 3.7 kilometres (2.3 mi) long and was followed by 100,000–150,000 people. As well as a show of respect to a national great man, the funeral ceremony had a dash of a patriotic protest.

The General Gustaf Mannerheim national fund had been founded as a citizens' gift for Mannerheim on 25 July 1919. In the will and testament Mannerheim had signed on 16 August 1945 he wrote that his fortune should be donated to this fund (currently known as the Mannerheim Foundation) and that the money should be primarily used to give grants for Finnish officers for studying at foreign military academies. The fund is also responsible for maintaining the Mannerheim Museum founded in 1951.

Mannerheim's horse, Käthy, was shot on a military order on 25 February 1953. There is a monument to the horse in Ypäjä.

== Legacy ==
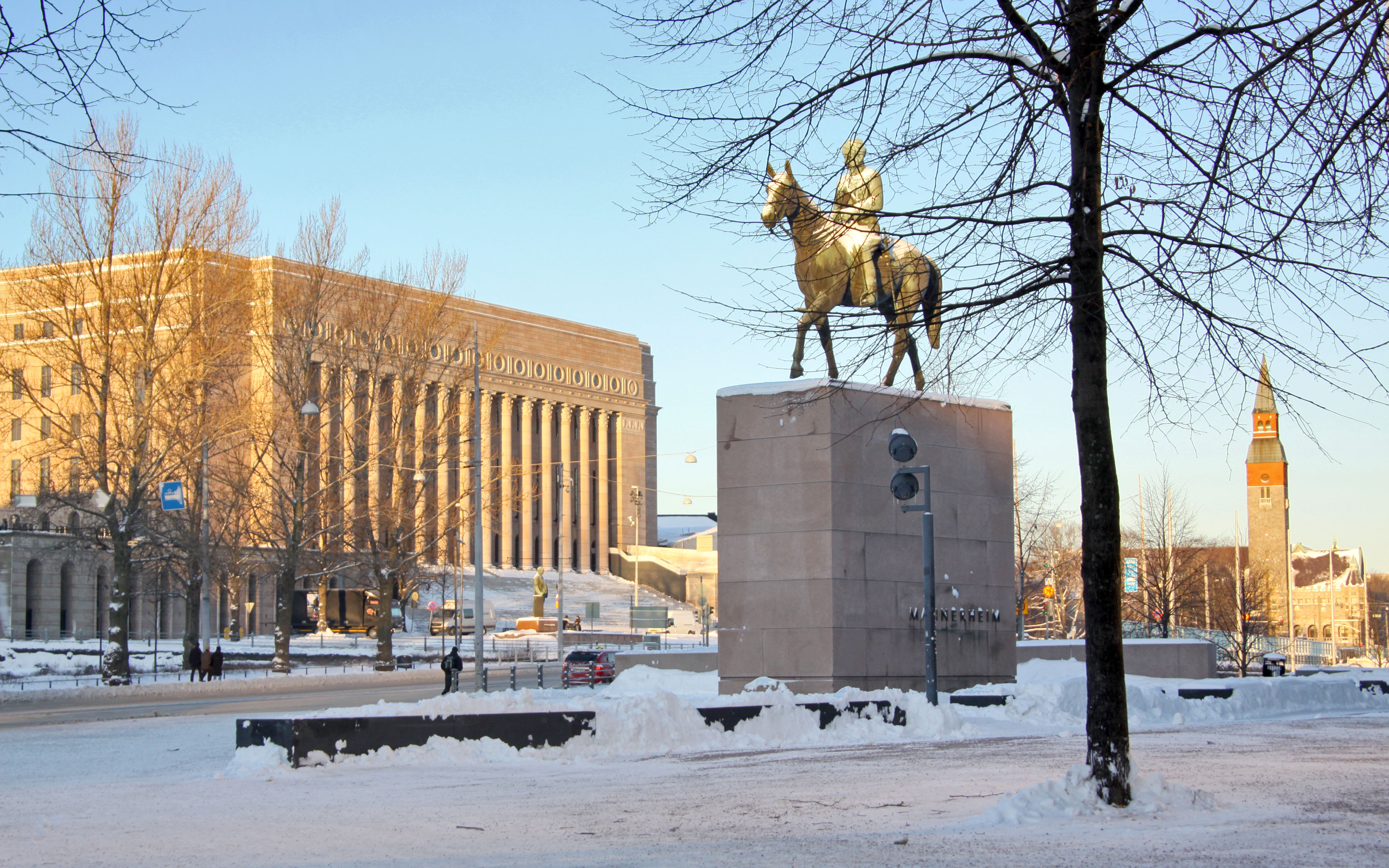
A bronze Equestrian statue of Marshal Mannerheim in Helsinki, with the House of Parliament and the National Museum in the background.

Today, Mannerheim retains respect as Finland's greatest statesman. This may be partly due to his refusal to enter partisan politics (although his sympathies were more right-wing than left-wing), his claim always to serve the fatherland without selfish motives, his personal courage in visiting the front lines, his ability to work diligently into his late seventies, and his foreign political farsightedness in preparing for the Soviet invasion of Finland years before it occurred. Although Finland fought alongside Nazi Germany during the Continuation War and thus in co-operation with the Axis powers, a number of leaders of the Allies still respected Mannerheim. These included, among others, the then British Prime Minister Winston Churchill; at a 2017 conference in London, war historian Terry Charman said it was difficult for Churchill to declare war on Finland at Stalin's demand due to his previous uncomplicated co-operation with Mannerheim, which led Churchill and Mannerheim to exchange polite and apologetic correspondence about the prevailing circumstance, with deep respect for each other.

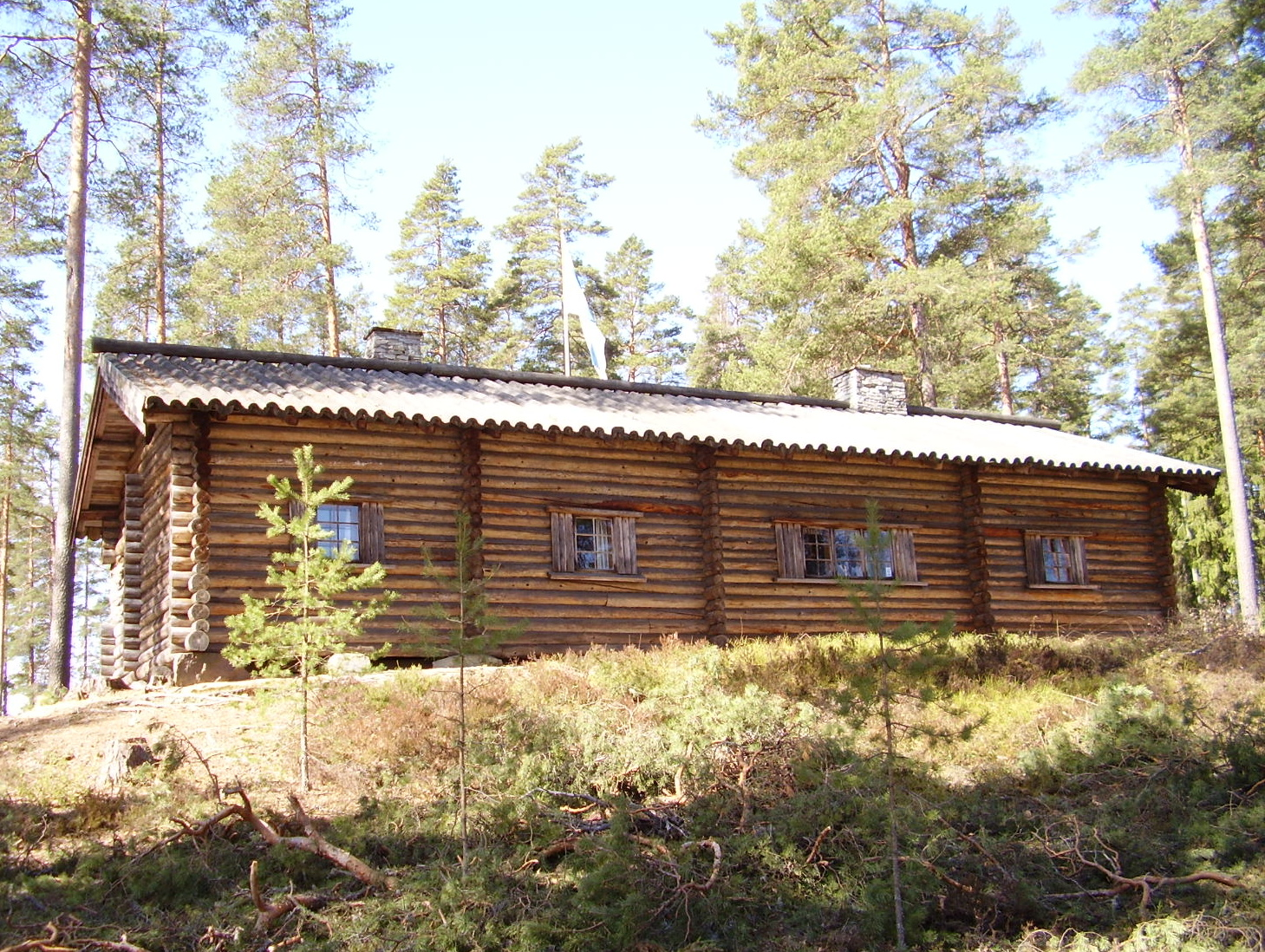
The Marshal's Cabin, Mannerheim's hunting lodge

Mannerheim's birthday, 4 June, is celebrated as the Flag Day of the Finnish Defence Forces. This decision was made by the Finnish government on the occasion of his 75th birthday in 1942, when he was also granted the title of Marshal of Finland. Flag Day is celebrated with a national parade, and rewards and promotions for members of the defence forces. The life and times of Mannerheim are memorialised in the Mannerheim Museum. The most prominent boulevard in the Finnish capital was renamed Mannerheimintie (Mannerheim Road) already in the Marshal's honour during his lifetime; along the road, at the Kamppi district, stands Hotel Marski, which is named after him. Mannerheim's former hunting lodge and resting place known as the "Marshal's Cabin" (Marskin Maja), which now serves as both a museum and a restaurant, is located at the shores of Lake Punelia in Loppi, Finland.

Various landmarks across Finland honour Mannerheim, including most famously the Equestrian statue located on Helsinki's Mannerheimintie in front of the later-built Kiasma museum of modern art. Mannerheim Parks in both Turku and Seinäjoki include statues of him. Tampere's Mannerheim statue depicting the victorious Civil War general of the Whites was eventually placed in the forest some kilometres outside the city (in part due to lingering controversy over Mannerheim's Civil War role). Other statues, for examples, were erected in Mikkeli and Lahti. On 5 December 2004, Mannerheim was voted the greatest Finnish person of all time in the Suuret suomalaiset (Great Finns) contest.

From 1937 to 1967, at least five different Finnish postage stamps or stamp series were issued in honour of Mannerheim; and in 1960 the United States honoured Mannerheim as the "Liberator of Finland" with regular first-class domestic and international stamps (at the time four cents and eight cents respectively) as part of its Champions of Liberty series that included other notable figures such as Mahatma Gandhi and Simon Bolivar.

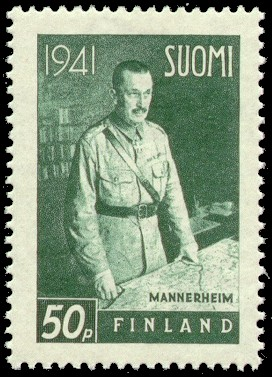
1941 Finnish postal stamp portraying the then-Field Marshal Mannerheim (he was appointed Marshal of Finland in 1942).

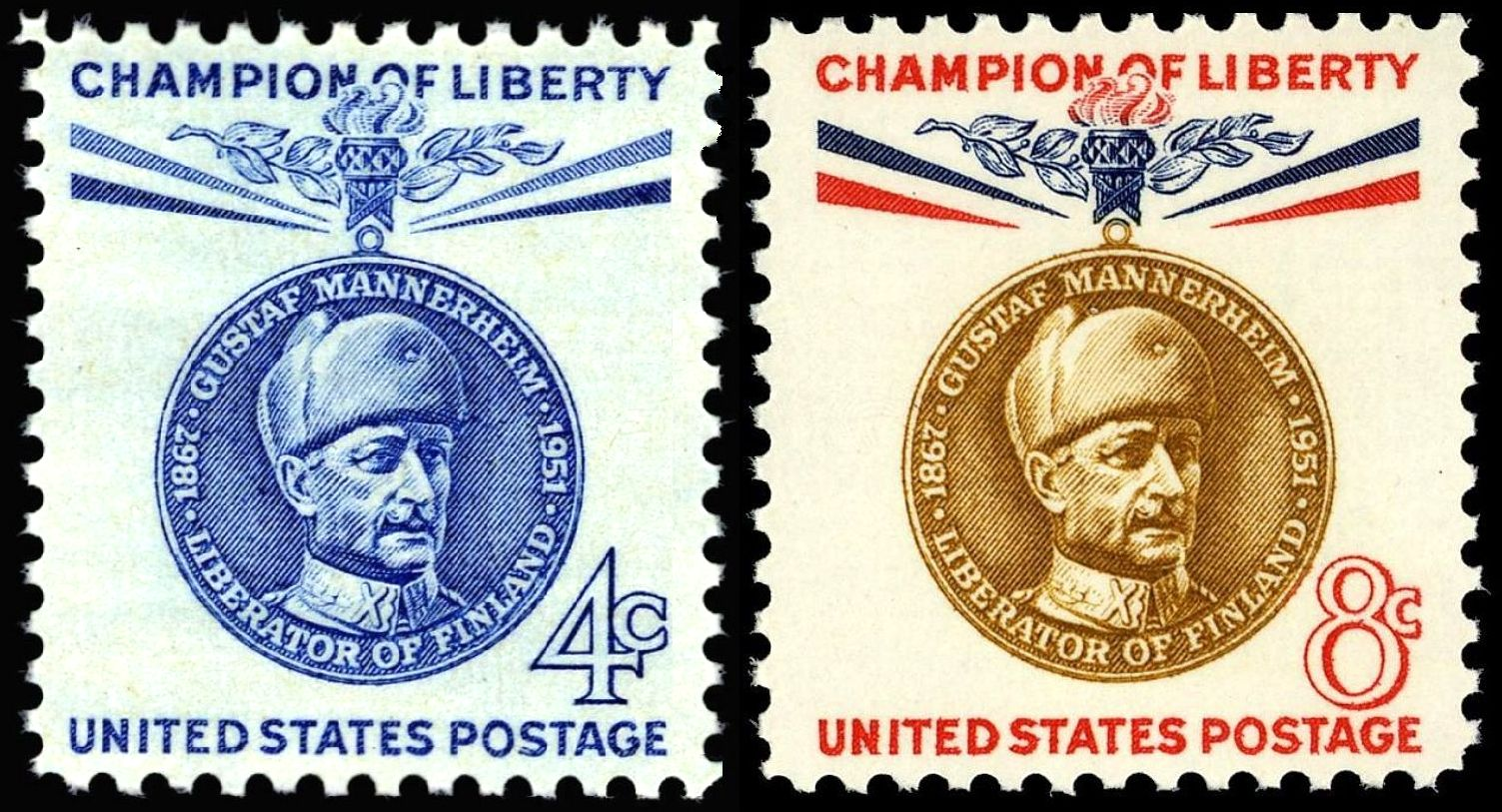
Marshal Mannerheim on two United States commemorative stamps, 1960 issue, part of the Champion of Liberty issues.

With the full-scale war between Russia and Ukraine that began in 2022, Mannerheim has become a source of inspiration for warfare leadership. He has been compared to, among other things, the Ukrainian hetman Pavlo Skoropadsky, who was known as a friend of Mannerheim. The Ukrainian translation of Mannerheim's memoirs has become a bestseller in Ukraine, where it has also received several Book of the Year awards.

== Military ranks ==
=== Ranks ===
==== In the Russian Army ====
- 1 July 1888: Non-commissioned officer
- 10 August 1889: Cornet
- 27 July 1891: Cornet of the Guard
- 30 August 1893: Lieutenant of the Guard
- 22 July 1899: Captain of the Guard, Junior grade
- 6 December 1902: Captain of the Guard
- 7 October 1904: Lieutenant Colonel
- 29 November 1905: Colonel
- 13 February 1911: Major General
- 25 April 1917: Lieutenant General

==== In the Finnish Army ====
- 7 March 1918: General of Cavalry

The titles Field Marshal (19 March 1933) and Marshal of Finland (4 June 1942) were not official military ranks although they are often thought of as such. Mannerheim's official military rank in the Finnish Army was General.

=== Supreme Command ===
- 1918: Commander-in-Chief of the White Guard: from January to May 1918
- 1918: Commander-in-Chief of the Finnish Defence Forces: from December 1918 to July 1919
- 1931: Chairman of the Defence Council: from 1931 to 1939
- 1939: Commander-in-Chief of the Finnish Defence Forces: from 1939 to 1946

== Awards ==
Coat of Arms of Gustaf Mannerheim
- Armiger: Gustaf Mannerheim
- Motto: "Candida pro causa ense candido"("With an honourable sword for an honourable cause")

In the course of his lifetime, Mannerheim received 82 military and civilian decorations.

National

- Republic of Finland:
  - Grand Cross with Swords and Diamonds of the Order of the Cross of Liberty (1940; Grand Cross with Swords: 1918)
  - Knight of the Mannerheim Cross, 1st and 2nd class, of the Order of the Cross of Liberty (1941)
  - Grand Cross with Collar, Swords and Diamonds of the Order of the White Rose (1944; Grand Cross with Collar: 1919)
  - Grand Cross with Swords of the Order of the Lion of Finland (1944)
- Russian Empire:
  - Order of St. Anna, 1st class (1914; 2nd class: 1904; 3rd class: 1900)
  - Order of St. Stanislaus, 1st class (1914; 2nd class: 1904)
  - Order of St. Vladimir, 2nd class (1916; 3rd class: 1914; 4th class: 1909)
  - Gold Sword for Bravery (1906)
  - Order of St. George, Knight 4th class (1914)
- Kingdom of Sweden:
  - Commander Grand Cross of the Order of the Sword (1918)
  - Knight of the Order of the Seraphim (1919)
  - Knight Grand Cross 1st Class of the Order of the Sword (1942)

Foreign

- (Austria) Austro-Hungarian Empire: Knight of the Order of Franz Joseph (1895)
- Independent State of Croatia: Grand Cross of the Order of the Crown of King Zvonimir with Swords (1942)
- Kingdom of Denmark: Knight of the Order of the Elephant (1919)
- Republic of Estonia:
  - Military Order of the Cross of the Eagle, 1st Class with Swords (1930)
  - Grand Cross of Order of the Estonian Red Cross (1933)
- (France) French Republic: Grand Cross of the Legion of Honour (1939; Officer: 1910; Knight: 1902)
- Germany:
  - (Germany) German Empire: Iron Cross 1st and 2nd Class (1918)
  - Nazi Germany:
    - Knight's Cross of the Iron Cross with Oak Leaves (1944; Knight's Cross: 1942; Clasp to the Iron Cross: 1942)
    - Grand Cross of the Order of the German Eagle in Gold with Star (1942)
    - Grand Cross of the German Red Cross Decoration with Oak Leaves (1937)
- Kingdom of Greece: Officer of the Order of the Saviour (1902)
- Kingdom of Hungary: Grand Cross of the Order of Merit of the Kingdom of Hungary with the Holy Crown of St. Stephen (1942)
- Kingdom of Italy:
  - Officer of the Order of Saints Maurice and Lazarus (1902)
  - Grand Officer of the Military Order of Savoy (1942)
- Empire of Japan: Grand Cordon of the Order of the Rising Sun with Paulownia Flowers (1942)
- Republic of Latvia: Honour Cross of the Latvian Red Cross (1938)
- Republic of Lithuania: Order of the Cross of Vytis, 2nd class, 2nd degree (1933)
- Kingdom of Romania: Order of Michael the Brave, 1st class (1941)
- United Kingdom: Knight Grand Cross of the Order of the British Empire (GBE) (1938)

== Works ==
- C.G. Mannerheim, Across Asia From West to East in 1906–1908. (1969) Anthropological Publications. Oosterhout N.B. – The Netherlands
- Across Asia : Vol. 1 – digital images

== Mannerheim as a person ==
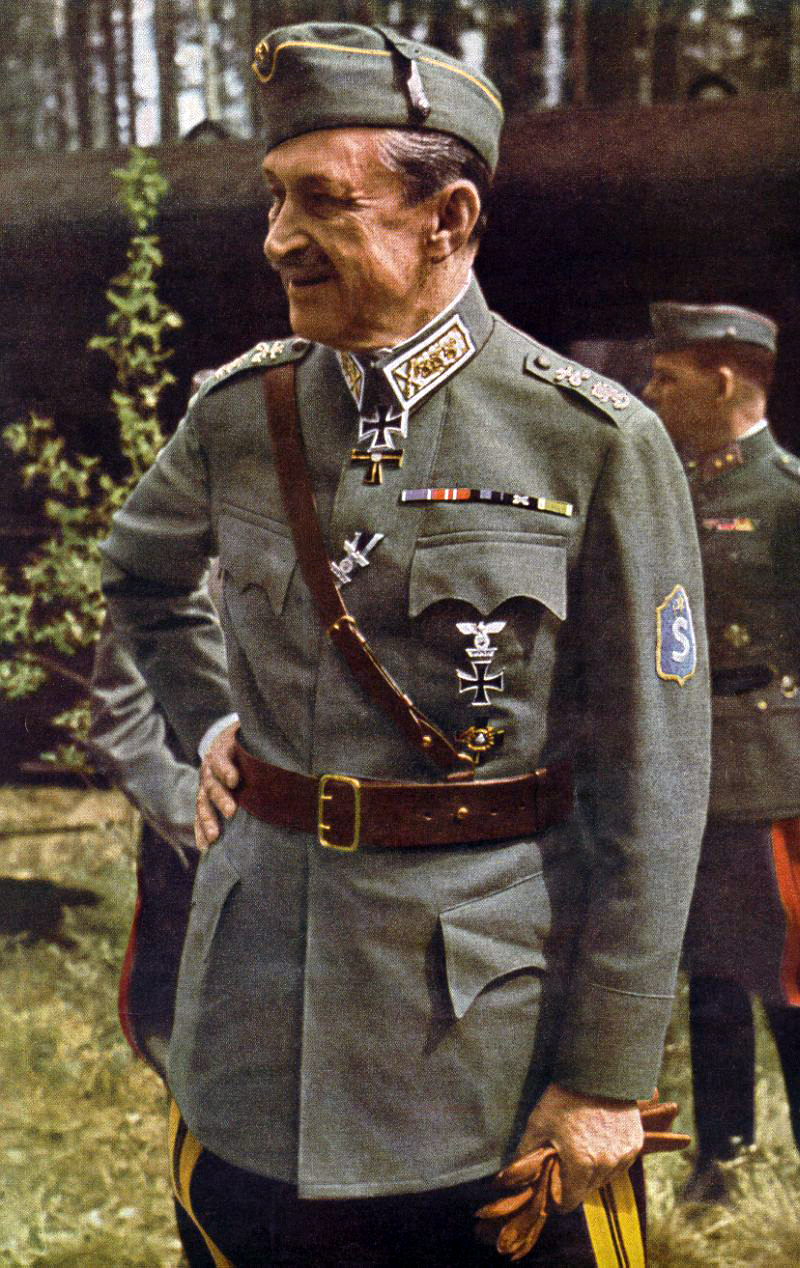
Mannerheim on his 75th birthday in a 1942 photograph.

=== Personality ===
As commander-in-chief of the army, Mannerheim was a very self-conscious and power-hungry supreme authority who did not tolerate his decisions being questioned, even by his trusted generals; Mannerheim's dissatisfaction with his subordinates could very quickly lead to the loss of his positions. Mannerheim did not follow the line staff leadership, which is the traditional way of leading in the General Staff, but led through individuals; when it came to commanders, he did not necessarily care about seniority or qualifications, but chose those who were most suitable for him, and if they were not suitable, he very quickly dismissed them. Well-known examples included General Paavo Talvela, who was a close associate and trusted officer of Mannerheim even before the Winter War; he constantly tested the nerves of the headquarters and tried to choose his own subordinates according to his own wishes, ending up in the Continuation War from the position of army corps commander to Mannerheim's "special envoy" to the German army headquarters in Berlin. During wartime, Mannerheim considered it of primary importance to maintain the Finland's social balance by providing support to those in need; Mannerheim knew that all people in society played an important role, even if it did not seem so in peacetime.

=== Religion ===
Mannerheim had been baptised into the Lutheran faith. Before his marriage to Anastasia Arapova, her parents tried to pressure him to convert to Orthodoxy, but in vain. Both of Mannerheim's daughters were Orthodox (one of them later converted to the Catholic faith).

During the Winter War and the Continuation War Mannerheim regularly attended Lutheran services at the Mikkeli Cathedral as well as Orthodox services at the Holy Trinity Church in Helsinki. During his final years in Switzerland Mannerheim attended Orthodox services at the Church of the Great Martyr Varvara in Vevey.

Mannerheim can be seen as religiously tolerant and broad-sighted. He also had seventeen godchildren from several different faiths.

=== Culinarism ===
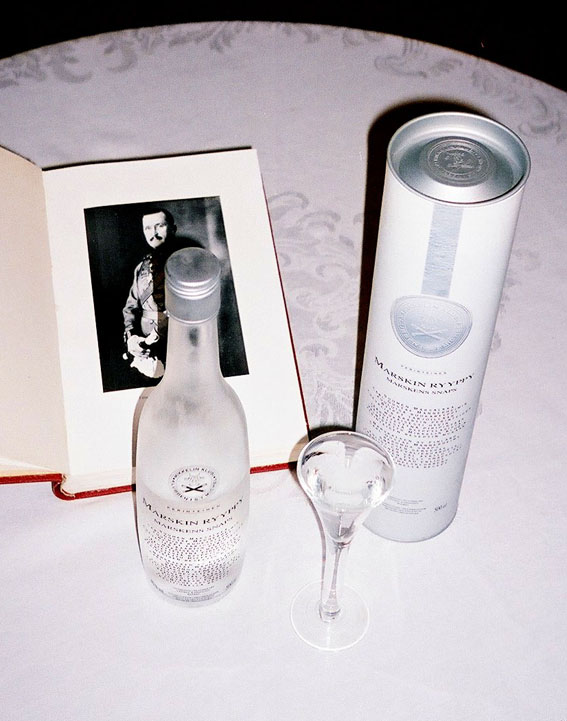
"Marskin ryyppy", the famous liqueur named after Mannerheim

Mannerheim was a great friend of good food, and he often wrote down recipes he liked. The food did not have to be fine or special cuisine, only good. He especially enjoyed stuffed pork, crayfish, crêpes, ruffe soup, fårikål and vorschmack. Mannerheim's name is connected to the famous liqueur "Marskin ryyppy", and at his home in Kaivopuisto he also had a large collection of the French wine Château Tertre Dauguay de Vassal, vintage 1929.

=== Style ===
Mannerheim was very careful about his style, which had been influenced by both his Victorian family and the imperial army of Russia which had a strict sense of etiquette among the officers. Mannerheim's appearance and clothes were highly groomed: he made sure his moustache was correctly shaped and his boots were thoroughly shined. According to John E. Screen, Mannerheim understood the importance of maintaining a public image: during the Continuation War Mannerheim forbade publishing photographs of him where he appeared tired. Mannerheim also took care of his health and washed his teeth with a water shower every day.

=== Cars ===
Mannerheim was famous for his cars, especially the ones donated to him by Germany during the Continuation War. Mannerheim was invited to be the honorary chairman at the Finnish Automobile Club at its first annual meeting in 1920. During Mannerheim's term as the regent of Finland from 1918 to 1919 his personal official car was a 1915 Rolls-Royce Silver Ghost, which has been preserved as a museum car to this day.

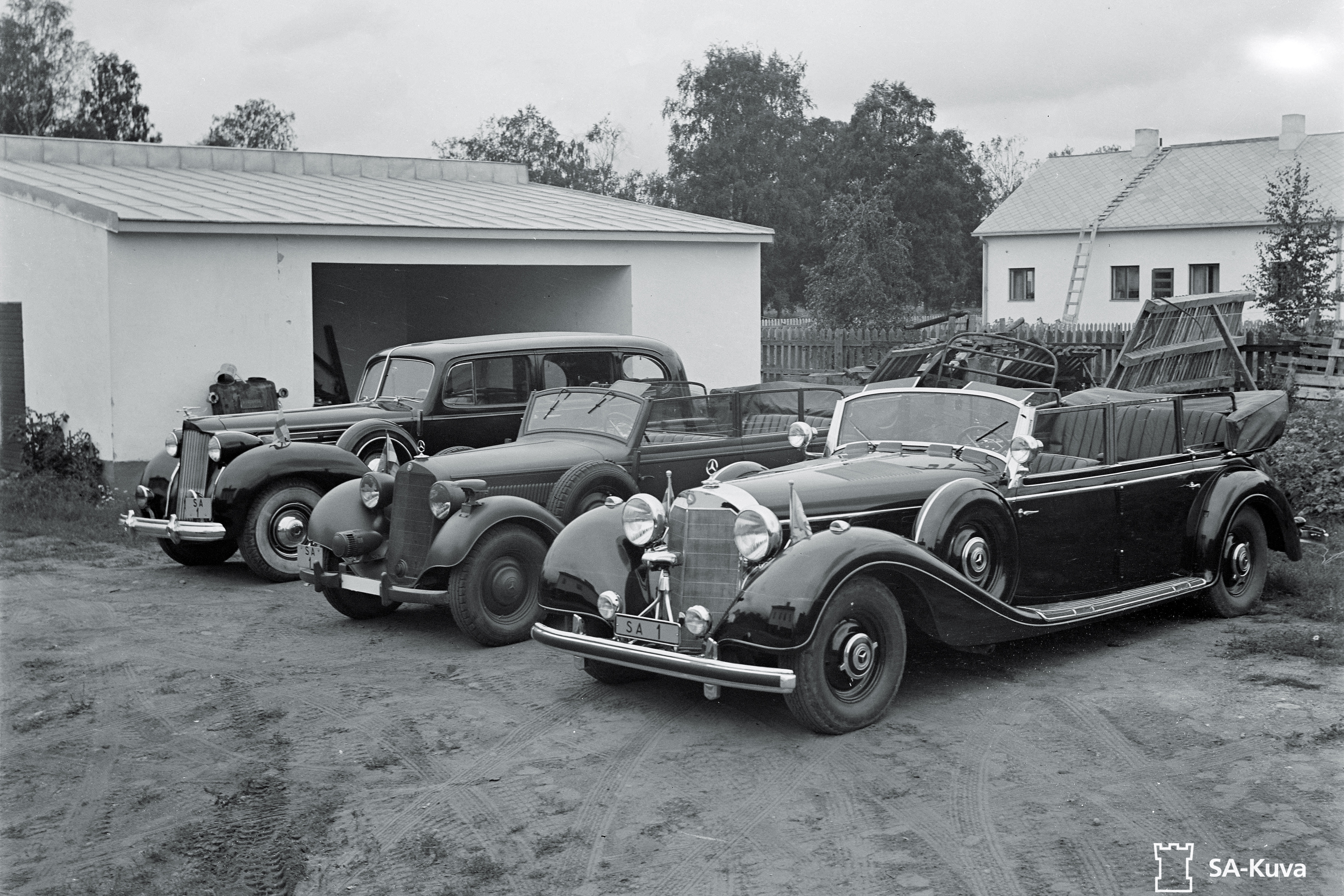
Mercedes-Benz 770 (right) donated by Hitler to Mannerheim

The most famous of Mannerheim's cars was an armoured Mercedes-Benz 770 donated to him by the German Führer Adolf Hitler in December 1941 as recognition of Finland's military prowess at the eastern front. The car was given to Mannerheim by Hitler's personal chauffeur Erich Kempka in Mikkeli. After the end of the wars, the car was sold to Sweden where it later ended up in the United States.

During his term as President of Finland Mannerheim used two official cars, Cadillacs from 1930 and 1938. Kalle Westerlund, the official chauffeur of the President of Finland from 1927 to 1963 recollects that Mannerheim's style was different from his predecessors. Mannerheim insisted that the chauffeur kept both hands on the steering wheel while driving. He also steadfastly insisted that the driver must not speak to the person sitting next to him while driving. Mannerheim also insisted on absolute punctuality down to the exact minute. According to Westerlund Mannerheim enjoyed fast driving, and if the journey had been relatively smooth, Mannerheim gave his thanks to the chauffeur.

Despite research from numerous archive sources it was uncertain for a long time whether Mannerheim himself had a driver's license. A license having belonged to Mannerheim was accidentally found at the National Archives of Finland among his other personal papers in December 2014. The Helsinki police department had given the license to Mannerheim in 1929 for a period of five years and it also allowed him to drive a passenger car and a motorcycle in private traffic. One of Mannerheim's private letters from 1928 shows that he already had a driver's license at that time. According to the June 1925 issue of the Moottori magazine published by the Finnish Automobile Club Mannerheim had made a long car journey to Europe in May 1925.

== Mannerheim in popular culture ==
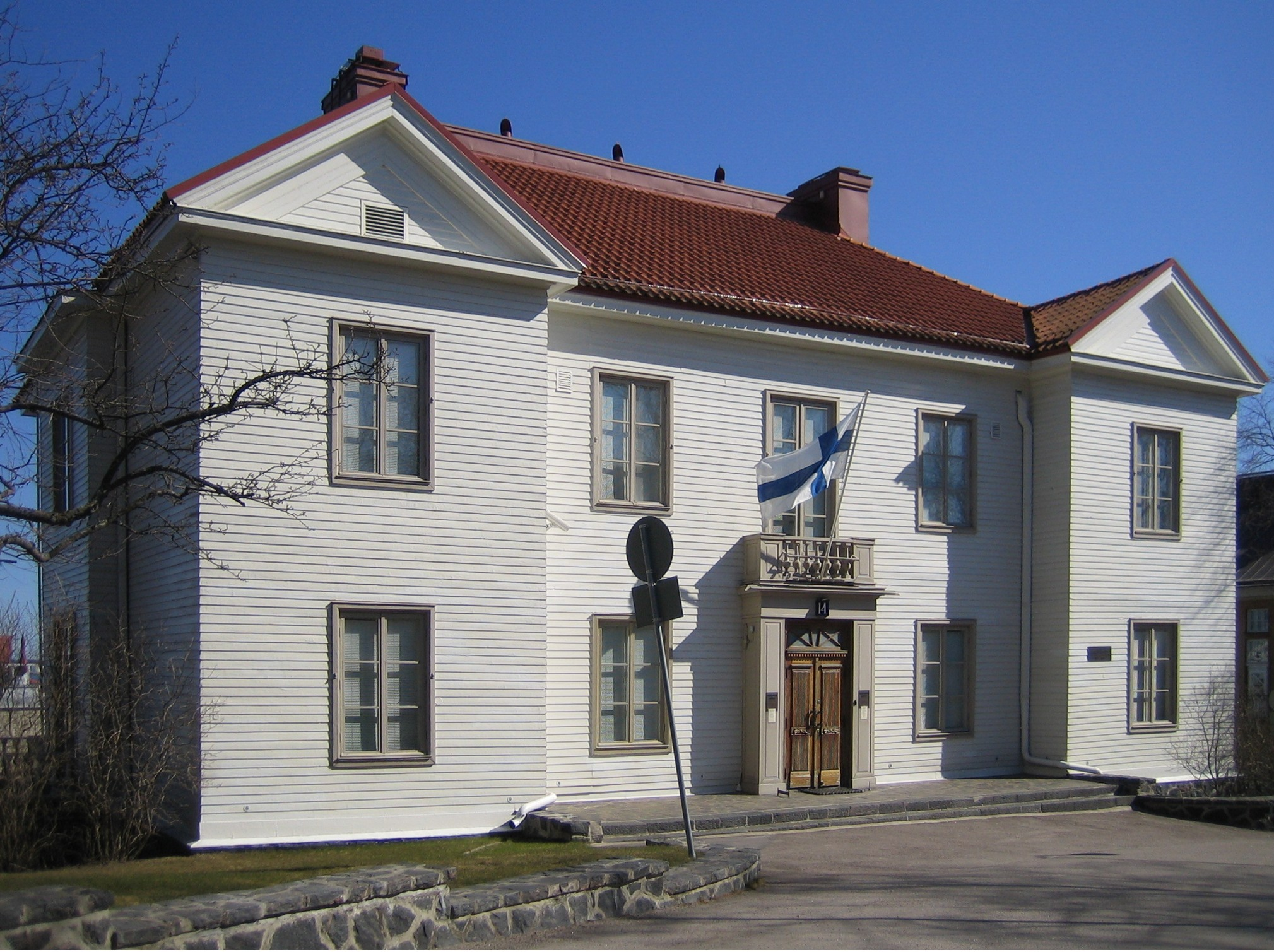
Mannerheim's home in Kaivopuisto in Helsinki. The house has served as the Mannerheim Museum since 1951.

The first fictive film about Mannerheim was The Headquarters (1970) by Matti Kassila, based on Ilmari Turja's play by the same name. In the film Mannerheim was played by Joel Rinne who had already performed in the same role at the National Theatre of Finland.

In the 2000s Renny Harlin was planning a biographical film about Mannerheim for a long time. The project was cancelled. Mannerheim would have been played by Mikko Nousiainen.

In 2012 Yleisradio made a film about Mannerheim titled The Marshal of Finland. The film was shot in Kenya and encountered mixed reception in Finland, but in Kenya it was awarded the Kalasha prize by the Kenya Film Commission.

There are also many television series and films about Mannerheim's life. In the television series Mummoni ja Mannerheim (1971) based on Paavo Rintala's novel trilogy the marshal was played by Helge Herala. In the drama series Sodan ja rauhan miehet (1978) about the years after World War II Mannerheim was played by Rolf Labbart, in the television film Valtapeliä elokuussa 1940 he was played by Asko Sarkola, and in the historical drama series Presidentit (2005) by Antti Litja. In the films Beyond the Front Line (2004) and Tali-Ihantala 1944 (2007) by Åke Lindman Mannerheim was played by Asko Sarkola. The five-part documentary Mannerheim - Jörn Donnerin kertomana was shown on YLE TV1 in January 2011. In the documentary Donner sought to show a contrastual whole image of Mannerheim.

The puppet animation film The Butterfly from Ural directed by Katariina Lillqvist raised a controversy in 2008 because it portrayed Mannerheim as homosexual or bisexual.

The character of Mannerheim appears at the end of the Kyrgyz drama film Kurmanjan Datka (2014) where he takes a photograph of the main character Kurmanjan Datka (1811–1907) in 1906. The photograph appears in the 50 Kyrgyz som banknote.

Mannerheim's relationship with Catharina "Kitty" Linder has also interested writers and the media. The monthly supplement of Helsingin Sanomat published an article about Kitty Linder and Mannerheim in 2013. In 2017 the character "Kitty" has appeared as Mannerheim's bride in Juha Vakkuri's novel Mannerheim ja saksalainen suudelma.

In 2016, the Ukrainian band Linija Mannerheima ("Mannerheim Line") was formed in response to the ongoing Russian hybrid offensive in Donbas. According to the band, Mannerheim is "a symbol of how society can unite to defend independence and resist aggression."

== See also ==
- Adolf Ehrnrooth
- Hitler and Mannerheim recording
- Johan Laidoner
- List of presidents of Finland
- List of wars involving Finland
- Mannerheim Cross
- Mannerheim Line
- Mannerheim Museum
- Mannerheim Park
- Mannerheimintie
- Marshal's Cabin
- The Marshal of Finland (film)
- Marskin ryyppy

== Bibliography ==
- Clements, Jonathan (2009). Mannerheim: President, Soldier, Spy. London: Haus Publishing. ISBN 978-1907822575.
- Ganzenmüller, Jörg. Das belagerte Leningrad 1941–1944 [Leningrad Besieged: 1941-1944] (in German). Paderborn: Verlag Ferdinand Schöningh. 2005. ISBN 3-506-72889-X.
- Jägerskiöld, Stig (1965). Nuori Mannerheim [Young Mannerheim] (in Finnish).
- Jägerskiöld, Stig (1983). Mannerheim 1867–1951. Helsinki: Otava Publications.
- Jägerskiöld, Stig (1986). Mannerheim: Marshal of Finland. Minneapolis: University of Minnesota Press. ISBN 0-8166-1527-6.
- Koskikallio, Petteri. Asko Lehmuskallio, and Harry Halén. C. G. Mannerheim in Central Asia 1906–1908. Helsinki: National Board of Antiquities, 1999. ISBN 951-616-048-4.
- Jakobson, Max (1999). Väkivallan vuodet, 20. vuosisadan tilinpäätös [20th Century Accounts: Years of Violence] (in Finnish). Otava. ISBN 9789511133698.
- Warner, Oliver (1967). Marshal Mannerheim and the Finns. London: Weidenfeld & Nicolson.
- Warner, Oliver (July 1964). "Mannerheim, Marshal of Finland, 1867–1951". History Today. Vol. 14, no. 7. pp. 461–468.
- Mannerheim, Carl Gustaf Emil (1953). The Memoirs of Marshal Mannerheim. London: Cassell. OCLC 12424452., primary source
- Meri, Veijo (1990). Suomen marsalkka C. G. Mannerheim (in Finnish).
- Pajunen, Jussi; Karjalainen, Mikko (2019). "Finnish Volunteer Battalion of the Waffen SS in 1941–1943 and Related Finnish studies" (PDF). Finno-German Yearbook of Political Economy. 2. Archived (PDF) from the original on 19 October 2021.
- Screen, J. E. O.. Screen, J. E. O. (1970). Mannerheim: The Years of Preparation. Vancouver: University of British Columbia Press. ISBN 0-900966-22-X.
- Screen, J. E. O.. Screen, J. E. O. (2000). Mannerheim: The Finnish Years. London: Hurst. ISBN 1-85065-573-1.
- Trotter, William (2013). A Frozen Hell: The Russo-Finnish Winter War of 1939–1940. Chapel Hill: Algonquin Books. ISBN 9781565126923.
- Martti Turtola. Turtola, Martti (1994). Risto Ryti: Elämä isänmaan puolesta [Risto Ryti: A Life for the Fatherland] (in Finnish). Helsinki: Otava.
- Tyni, Mikko (2022). Marsalkan muskettisoturit – Mannerheimin henkivartiointi ja turvallisuus 1918–1946 (in Finnish). Jyväskylä: Docendo. ISBN 9789523823891.
- Westerlund, Lars. The Finnish SS Volunteers and Atrocities 1941–1943 (PDF). The National Archives of Finland and Finnish Literature Society. 2019. ISBN 978-951-858-111-9. Archived (PDF) from the original on 23 August 2021.
- Tepora, Tuomas (2023). Sankari ja antisankari — Mannerheim-kultin pitkä vuosisata [The Hero and the Anti-hero: the Long Century of the Mannerheim Cult] (in Finnish). Gaudeamus. ISBN 9789523452220.

Regnal titles
Preceded by Pehr Evind Svinhufvud	Regent of Finland; 1918–1919	Succeeded by Kaarlo Juho Ståhlberg as President of the Republic
Political offices
Preceded by Risto Ryti	President of Finland; 1944–1946	Succeeded by Juho Kusti Paasikivi
Military offices
Preceded by New creation	Supreme Commander of the forces of the Republic of Finland; 1918	Succeeded by Major General K. F. Wilkama
Preceded by Lieutenant General Hugo Österman	Chief of Defence; 1939–1945	Succeeded by General Erik Heinrichs
