= Oja =

Oja may refer to:

- Oja (river), river in La Rioja, Spain
- Oja (surname), an Estonian and Finnish surname
- 5080 Oja, main-belt asteroid
- Ōja Station, railway station in Hashikami, Japan
- Oja's rule, a model of properties of neurons in the brain
- "Oja", a 2019 song by Reminisce
- Ọjà, musical instrument of the Igbo people

== See also ==
- Öja (disambiguation)
- OJA (disambiguation)
- Oya (disambiguation)
- Ojha, an Indian surname
