= Oja (surname) =

Family name

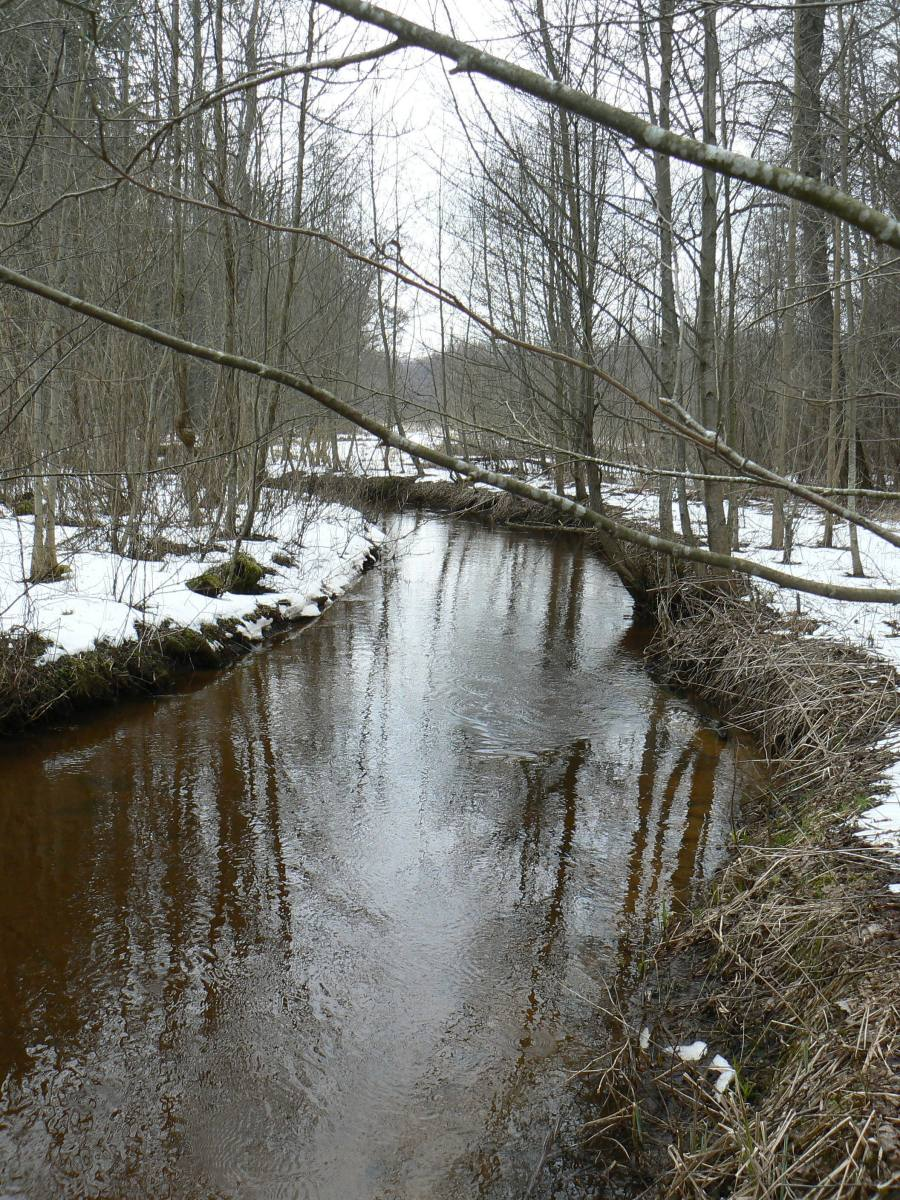
- Nigula stream (Nigula oja) in Tartu County, Estonia

Origin
- Languages: Estonian, Finnish
- Meaning: stream (Estonian and Finnish) ditch (Finnish)
- Region of origin: Estonia, Finland

Other names
- Related names: Ojala, Ojamaa, Ojaste, Ojastu

Oja is an Estonian and Finnish surname of Laine type meaning "stream" and "brook" in both languages, as well as "ditch" in Finnish. As of 2019, there were 1,891 people with the surname in Estonia: 926 men and 965 women. Oja is ranked as the 15th most common surname in Estonia. People bearing the surname Oja include:

- Andres Oja (drummer), (born 1958), Estonian drummer
- Andres Oja (actor), (born 1983), Estonian actor
- Bruno O'Ya (born Bruno Oja; 1933–2002), Estonian-Polish actor
- Dagmar Oja (born 1981), Estonian singer
- Eduard Oja (1905–1950), Estonian composer, conductor, music teacher and critic
- Erkki Oja (born 1948), Finnish computer scientist
- Eve Oja (1948–2019), Estonian mathematician
- Hannu Oja (born 1950), Finnish statistician
- Heikki Oja (born 1945), Finnish astronomer and writer
- Kristjan Oja (born 1968) Estonian biathlete
- Pääru Oja (born 1989), Estonian actor
- Peeter Oja (born 1960), Estonian actor, singer, comedian and media personality
- Regina Oja (born 1996), Estonian biathlete
- Rein Oja (born 1956), Estonian actor
- Silva Oja (born 1961), Estonian heptathlete
- Tarmo Oja (1934–2024), Estonian-Swedish astronomer
- Tasuja Oja (1888–1946), Estonian politician and civil servant
- Tõnu Oja (born 1958), Estonian actor

== As a given name ==
- Oja Kodar (born 1941), Croatian actress, screenwriter and director
