= Öja =

Öja may refer to:

- Öja (Finland), an island in Kokkola region, Finland
- Öja, Nynäshamn, an island in the Stockholm archipelago, Sweden
- Öja, Gotland, a settlement in Sweden
- Ōja Station, a railway station in Hashikami, Japan

== See also ==
- Oja (disambiguation)
- OJA (disambiguation)
