= Oia =

Oia or OIA may refer to:

== Places ==
- Oia, Spain, a municipality in Galicia, in the province of Pontevedra
- Oia, Greece, a small town on the island of Santorini
- Oia, alternate name of Oea (Attica), a town of ancient Attica
- Oia, alternate name of Oea (Thera), a town of ancient Thera (Santorini)

== Transportation ==
- Ourilândia do Norte Airport, an airport with IATA identifier OIA
- Orlando International Airport ("OIA" is a local abbreviation), which actually uses the letters MCO for its airport designation

== Government ==
- Office of the Independent Adjudicator, the higher-education ombudsman in the United Kingdom
- Official Information Act 1982, a piece of New Zealand legislation
- Office of Insular Affairs, an office of the United States Department of the Interior
- DHS Office of Intelligence and Analysis, an office of the United States Department of Homeland Security
- Office of Intelligence and Analysis (United States Department of the Treasury), the intelligence organization of the U.S. Department of the Treasury
- Oman Investment Authority, a sovereign wealth fund

== Other uses ==
- Another name for Ọya, a Yoruba deity
- Oia (spider), a genus of spiders in the family Linyphiidae
- Oahu Interscholastic Association, an athletic association of public secondary schools on the island of Oahu, Hawaii
- Old Indo-Aryan, the earlier Indo-Aryan languages

== See also ==
- Oya (disambiguation)
