= Ojala =

Ojala or ojalá may refer to:

- "Ojalá", a Spanish expression
- Ojala (surname)
- Ojala, California, an unincorporated community, United States
- "Ojalá" (María Becerra song), 2022
- "Ojalá" (Ha*Ash song), 2017
- "Ojalá", a song by Juanes from Vida Cotidiana, 2023
- "Ojalá", a song by Paulo Londra
- "Ojalá", a song by Silvio Rodríguez from Al final de este viaje...
- "Ojalá", a song by Wisin & Yandel featuring Farruko from Los campeones del pueblo
