= Fundamental Astronomy =

Astronomy textbook

- Author: Hannu Karttunen; Pekka Kröger; Markku Poutanen; Karl Johan Donner
- Genre: Astronomy
- Publisher: Sprigner
- Publication date: 1984
- Publication place: Finland
- ISBN: 978-3662530443

Fundamental Astronomy (1984–2017) is an astronomy textbook by Finnish author Hannu Karttunen of University of Turku; Pekka Kröger and Heikki Oja of University of Helsinki; Markku Poutanen of Finnish Geodetic Institute; and Karl Johan Donner of University of Helsinki. The first edition was published in Finnish by Ursa, Helsinki, 1984, and later published in English by Springer. The 6th edition was published in 2017 (ISBN 978-3-662-53044-3; previous editions were published in 2007, 2003, 1996, 1994 and 1987). It contains 548 pages and is illustrated with more than 419 images, including 34 color plates. There are many pages on the Solar System, the Milky Way, galaxies, and cosmology.

Aimed at the science student market, this textbook is both for undergraduates and for graduates just beginning their courses who are looking for an overview. It covers the whole field of modern astronomy. While emphasizing both the astronomical concepts and the underlying physical principles, the text provides a basis for more further studies in the astronomical sciences.
