= Oya (disambiguation) =

Oya is a divinity found in Yoruba religion, Santeria and other belief systems.

Oya or OYA may also refer to:

== Places ==
- Øya, a neighborhood in Trondheim, Norway
- Oya, Sarawak, a town in Malaysia
- Oya River, a river in Malaysia
- Ōya Station (Nagano) in Japan
- Ōya Station (Gifu) in Japan
- Oia, Spain, a municipality in Galicia, Spain
- Oya, Raebareli, a village in Uttar Pradesh, India

== Other uses ==
- OYA, the Oregon Youth Authority, a state agency in the US
- Oya (name), a given name and surname (including a list of persons with the name)
- Oya (comics), Marvel Comics character
- Oya (lace), also known as Turkish lace
- Ōya stone, a type of igneous rock
- 9602 Oya, a minor planet
- Goya Airport IATA code

== See also ==
- Oya’oya language, an Austronesian dialect cluster of Papua New Guinea
- Oia (disambiguation)
- Olla (disambiguation)
- Oja (disambiguation)
