= List of ambassadors of Turkey to ICAO =

The list of ambassadors of Turkey to ICAO includes diplomats responsible for representing Turkey within the International Civil Aviation Organization (ICAO). Turkey is a founding member of ICAO through the 1944 Chicago Convention. In 1978, a bureau for ICAO affairs was established under the Embassy of Turkey in Ottawa, which was upgraded to a Permanent Mission in 1990.

== List of ambassadors ==
#	Ambassador	Term start	Term end	Ref.
1	Ümit Pamir	1 January 1990	1 January 1991	
2	Ünal Maraşlı	1 January 1991	1 January 1995	
3	Tanju Ülgen	1 January 1995	1 January 1997	
4	Hatay Savaşçı	1 January 1997	16 July 1999	
5	Oya Tuzcuoğlu	1 August 1999	30 May 2002	
6	Sadi Çalışlar	1 June 2002	1 December 2006	
7	Vakur Gökdenizler	15 December 2006	30 June 2010	
8	Oya Tuzcuoğlu	15 July 2010	1 September 2012	
9	Çağatay Erciyes	1 September 2012	11 September 2015	
10	Ali Rıza Çolak	11 September 2015	29 December 2019	
11	Suat Hayri Aka	1 January 2020	24 September 2023	
12	Nevzat Uyanık	24 September 2023	Present	

== See also ==
- International Civil Aviation Organization
- Ministry of Transport and Infrastructure
- Ministry of Foreign Affairs
- List of diplomatic missions of Turkey
