= Villa Kleineh =

House in Helsinki, Finland

Coordinates: 60.1578°N 24.9584°E

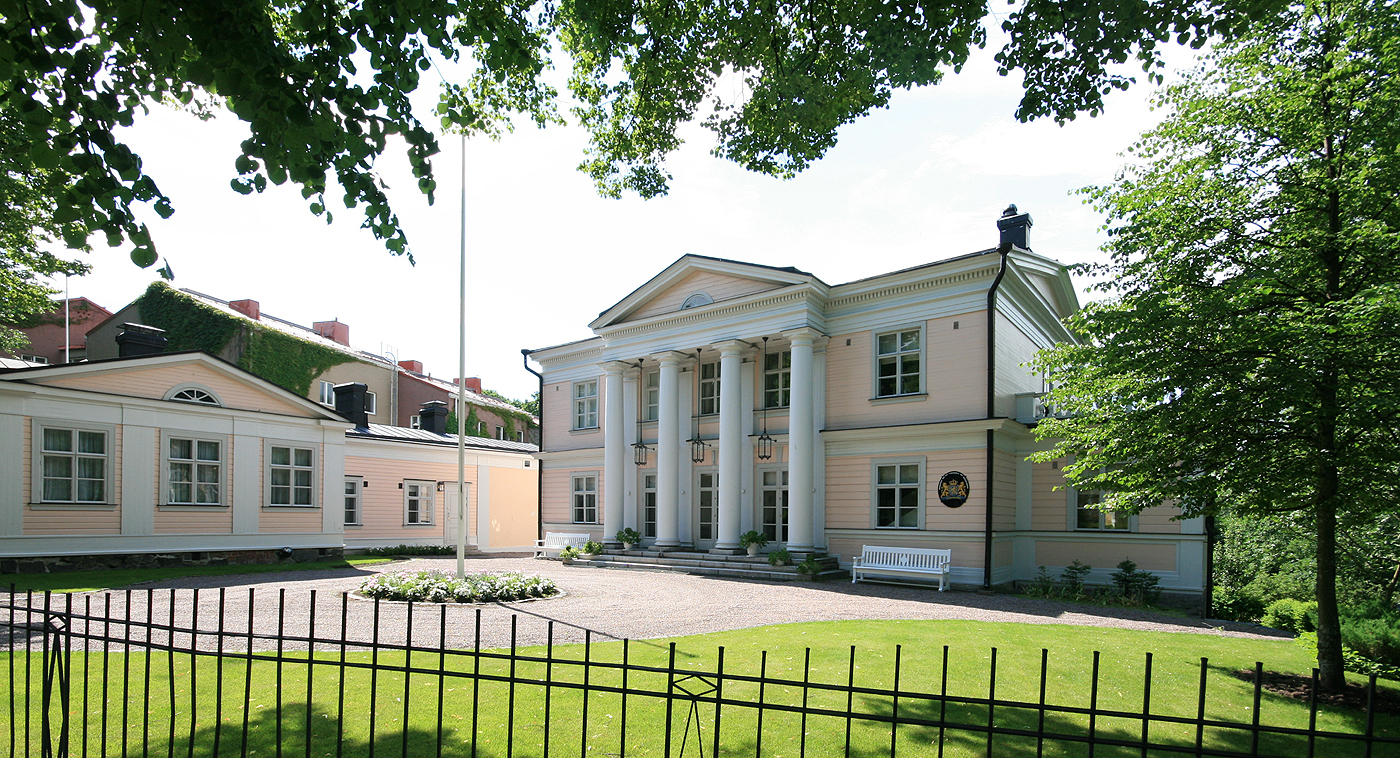
Itäinen Puistotie 7.

The villa Kleineh (also known in English as House of Adlercreutz) is an old villa in Helsinki's Kaivopuisto, Finland. Nowadays it is the oldest villa in Kaivopuisto and the official residence of the ambassador of the Netherlands to Finland.

The building is located at Itäinen Puistotie 7 and was built for the Ullanlinna bath house guests. The lot was handed over in 1839 and the building is assumed to have been finished during the next year. It is unsure who the architect is, but some sources mention Carl Ludvig Engel and his student Jean Wik. It has also been argued that C.A. Edelfelt was the architect, but at the time the building was being finished, Edelfelt hadn't started his career yet.

The "Bath- and wellhouse" corporation by Viktor Hartwall, A.W. Astenius and J.A. Decker took the initiative of building the house. They let it to guests of the bathhouses during summers. In 1857 restaurateur Louis Kleineh bought the house for personal use and it remained family property until 1928. From that time on the house is being called "Villa Kleineh".

The architecture of the house was representative of the Empire style. This was further expanded by Jean Wik in 1858 and Theodor Decker in 1872. More modifications have been made during the years 1882, 1889 and 1914. In 1928 the director of Nobel Standard, Leopold Lerche, bought the villa. During the next year he had Birger Bederley make more and larger modifications than ever before. During that time Villa Kleineh got its classicist look that it now still has.

Lerche died in 1929 and in 1954 the family of his widow's children inherited the villa. Their family name was Adlercreutz and for that reason the villa got its second name "Villa Adlercreutz". After the Second World War the villa was in use of the British delegation of the Allied Commission. The villa and its garden are protected from 1965 on. After the death in 1989 of the last resident of the villa, Henrik Adlercreutz, the building became property of a developer and it remained mostly empty. The later owner Merita Bank let the villa in 1998 as a residence to the ambassador of the Netherlands. Two years later it was sold to the Netherlands state. The ambassador is a resident of the villa since November 1999.

In the movie "Kaivopuiston kaunis Regina" (1941) the house functions as the summer house of monarch Popoff. According to local ghost traditions, the ghost of Kleineh's second wife, Maria Kleineh (maiden name Maria Kristina Forsell) still roams through Villa Kleineh and Kaivopuisto.

== Sources ==
=== Literature ===
- Villa Kleineh: van zomerverblijf voor badgasten tot Nederlandse residentie. Helsingin kaupunginmuseo, 2001. ISBN 951-718-674-6.
  - Merisalo, Tiina: "De bouwgeschiedenis van Villa Kleineh", p. 60–71.
  - Pehkonen, Marja: "Louis Kleineh, een onvergetelijke gastheer", p. 76–79.
