= 5080 =

5080 may refer to:

- 5080, a number in the 5000 (number) range
- A.D. 5080, a year of the 6th millennium CE
- 5080 BCE, a year in the 6th millennium BC
- 5080 Oja, an asteroid in the Asteroid Belt, the 5080th asteroid registered
- Tokyu 5080 series, an electric multiple unit train series
- GeForce RTX 5080
