= Olla (disambiguation) =

Olla may refer to:

== Cooking ==
- Olla, a ceramic cooking pot, used in Spain and Spanish-speaking Latin America countries
- Olla (Roman pot), the very similar ancient Roman version
- Tamal de olla, a large Panamanian tamal that fills the baking pan in which it is cooked

== Places ==
- Olla, Louisiana, a town in La Salle Parish, United States
- Olla, Kwara, a town in Western Nigeria

== Other uses ==
- Olla (beetle), a genus of ladybird beetles in the subfamily Coccinellinae
- Olla (fungus), a genus of fungi in the family Hyaloscyphaceae
- Olla (film), a 2019 French short film directed by Ariane Labed
- Olla, LLC, the parent company of Pickle-Ball, Inc.
- Olla, a Swedish term for touching the glans penis to something

== See also ==
- Hebban olla vogala, the first three words of a fragment of Dutch discovered in 1932 in the margin of a Latin manuscript
- Oya (disambiguation)
- Johnny Ola, a fictional character in The Godfather Part II
