= Louis Kleineh =

- Born: Louis Gabriel Kleineh; 1808; Rietberg, Kingdom of Westphalia (present-day Germany)
- Died: 1874 (aged 65–66); Helsinki, Grand Duchy of Finland
- Citizenship: Grand Duchy of Finland
- Occupations: Hotelier, restaurateur

Louis Gabriel Kleineh (1808–1874) was a German-born hotelier and restaurateur in Finland. He played a central role in the development of Helsinki's hotel and restaurant trade in the mid-nineteenth century. He is regarded as the city's first truly significant restaurateur, and over several decades ran the most influential establishments in the Finnish capital, including the Society House (Societetshuset), Brunnshuset, and Hotel Kleineh. Through his work he laid the foundations for later figures in the trade, most notably Carl Kämp.

== Biography ==
=== Background ===
After Helsinki became the capital of the Grand Duchy of Finland — an autonomous part of the Russian Empire — in 1812, and the university was relocated there from Turku in 1828, the city developed a lively cultural and social life. Hotels, restaurants, and cafés gathered around the central administrative districts between Senate Square and the Market Square, and along the Esplanade. The seaside spa at Ulrikasborg and its associated Brunnshuset bathhouse, opened in 1838, became particularly important for tourism.

A pioneer in the trade was Cajsa Wahllund, originally from the Swedish province of Värmland and previously active in Turku. In 1819 she moved to Helsinki, where she ran several hotels and restaurants, including the Old Society House at the Market Square and an outdoor restaurant in Kaisaniemi Park founded in 1837, which came to bear her name. It was into this environment that Louis Kleineh arrived in 1840. Born in Rietberg in Westphalia, he belonged to a family of Prussian origin that had originally borne the name Kleinheinrich. He married Maria Christina Forsell, from a soldier and burgher family in Fredrikshamn, and later became a Finnish citizen. The couple first lived at Sveaborg, the sea fortress off Helsinki, where Kleineh served as steward of the noblemen's club, before settling in the city.

=== The Society House and Brunnshuset ===
Kleineh soon opened his own establishment, the Hôtel de S:t Petersbourg, at Unionsgatan. His professional skill and energy attracted wide admiration, and in 1843 he was appointed manager of the Old Society House. Under his direction it developed into a centre of the capital's cultural and academic life, hosting grand banquets, concerts, and theatrical performances. The Swedish soprano Jenny Lind performed there in 1843, and in 1852 the Society House was the venue for the world premiere of Kung Karls jakt, the first opera composed in Finland, with a libretto by Zacharias Topelius and music by Fredrik Pacius. In 1857 the explorer Adolf Erik Nordenskiöld delivered a noted patriotic speech at the Society House that brought him into conflict with the Russian imperial authorities and ultimately led to his exile from Finland.

Alongside his work at the Society House, Kleineh ran the restaurant at Brunnshuset during several summers in the 1840s and 1850s. He worked to develop the area into a popular leisure destination.
