= Martti Välikangas =

Finnish architect

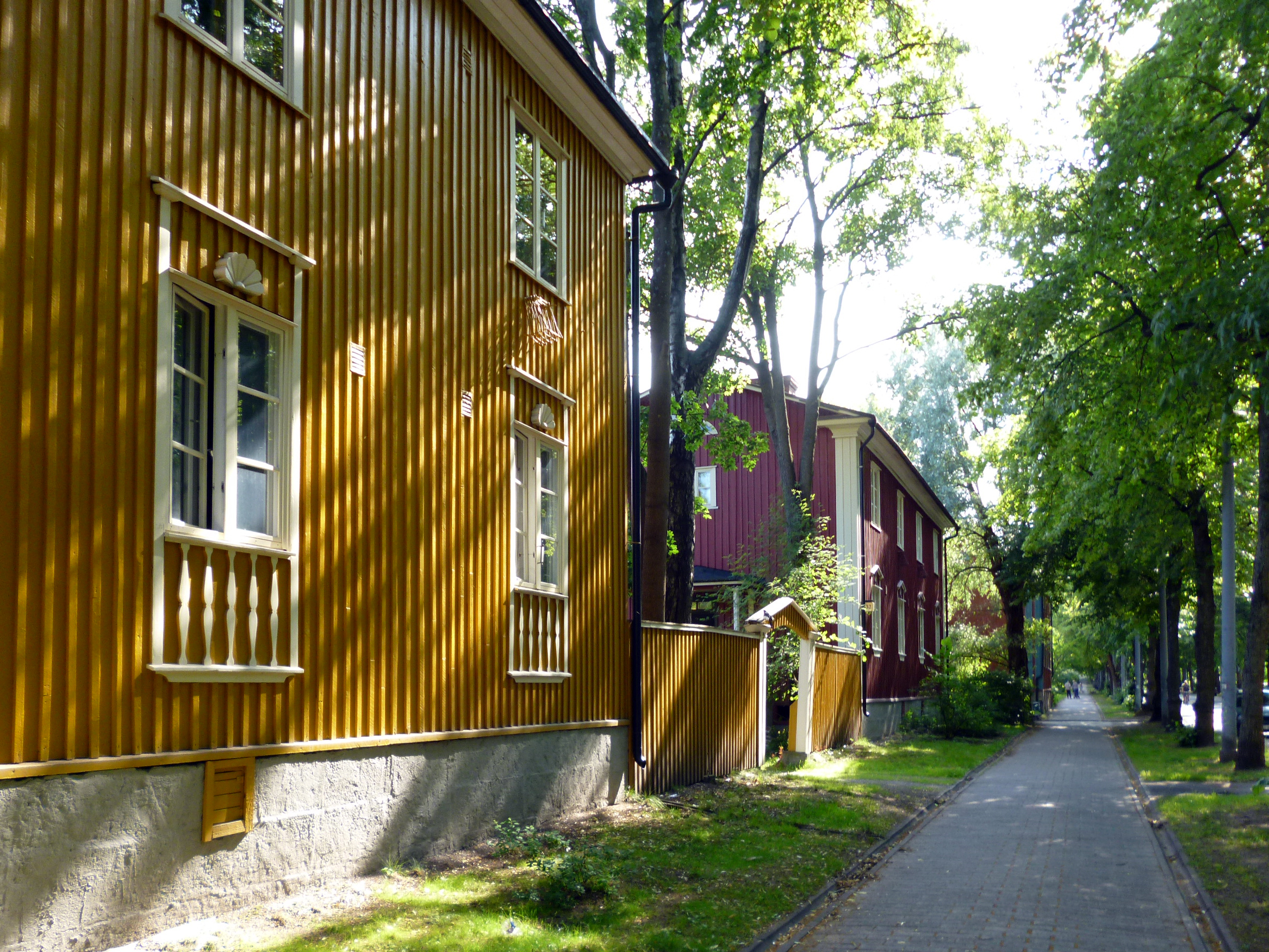
Puu-Käpylä workers' housing area, Helsinki

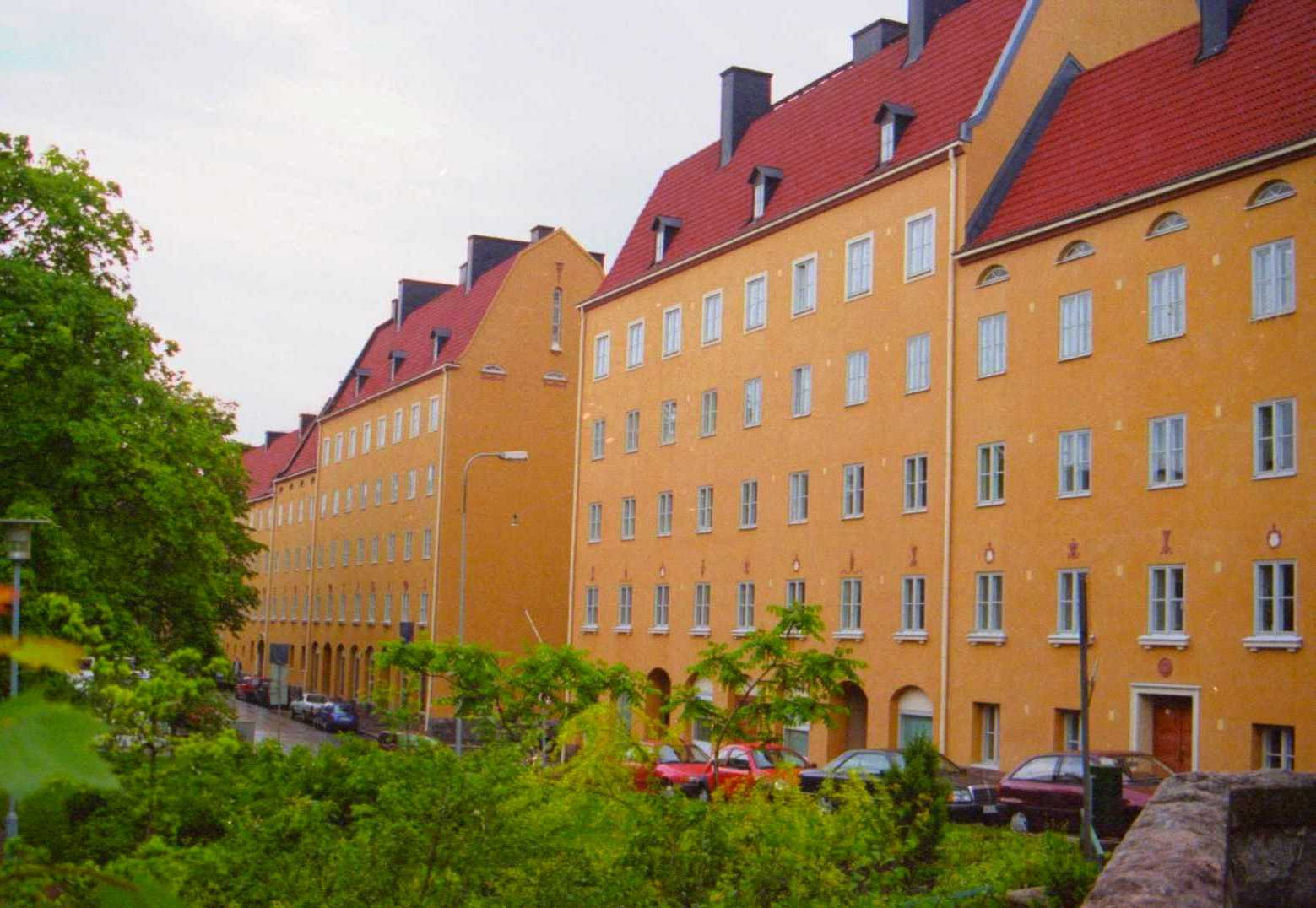
Convergent apartment buildings, dating from 1924 to 1925, on Hauhontie in Vallila, Helsinki

Martti Välikangas (born Martti Buddén, August 1, 1893, County of Kuopio – May 9, 1973, Helsinki) was a Finnish architect renowned for the design of so-called "Puu-Käpylä" [Wood-Käpylä], the Garden City housing area in Käpylä near Helsinki, designed in the Nordic Classicism style.

== Career ==
Välikangas studied architecture at Helsinki University of Technology, qualifying as an architect in 1917. In 1921 he left on a study tour of Italy (as well as visiting the other Nordic countries, Germany, France and north Africa), a common practice at that time for architects in the Nordic countries who were turning away from National Romanticism.

After qualifying Välikangas worked in Yuzovka (present-day Donetsk in Ukraine), but had to leave in a hurry with the onset of the Bolshevik Revolution. On his return, he worked for the Brändö Villastad company as well as in the architect's office of Gösta Juslén and, from 1918 to 1920, in the office of Frosterus and Gripenberg. Välikangas founded his own office in 1920, while also working elsewhere. Among his many other positions, he was chief architect at the National Board of Building from 1937 until the Winter War in 1940, from 1942 to 1944 he was head of the office responsible for post-war reconstruction, he acted as the director of the board responsible for the restoration of Turku Castle, he was the chief architect at the Helsinki Workers' Savings Bank, and from 1928 to 1930 he was Editor-in-Chief of the Finnish Architectural Review, in doing so influencing the spread of Modernist architecture in Finland.

He is buried in the Hietaniemi Cemetery in Helsinki. The archives of Martti Välikangas are in the possession of the Museum of Finnish Architecture in Helsinki.

== Work ==
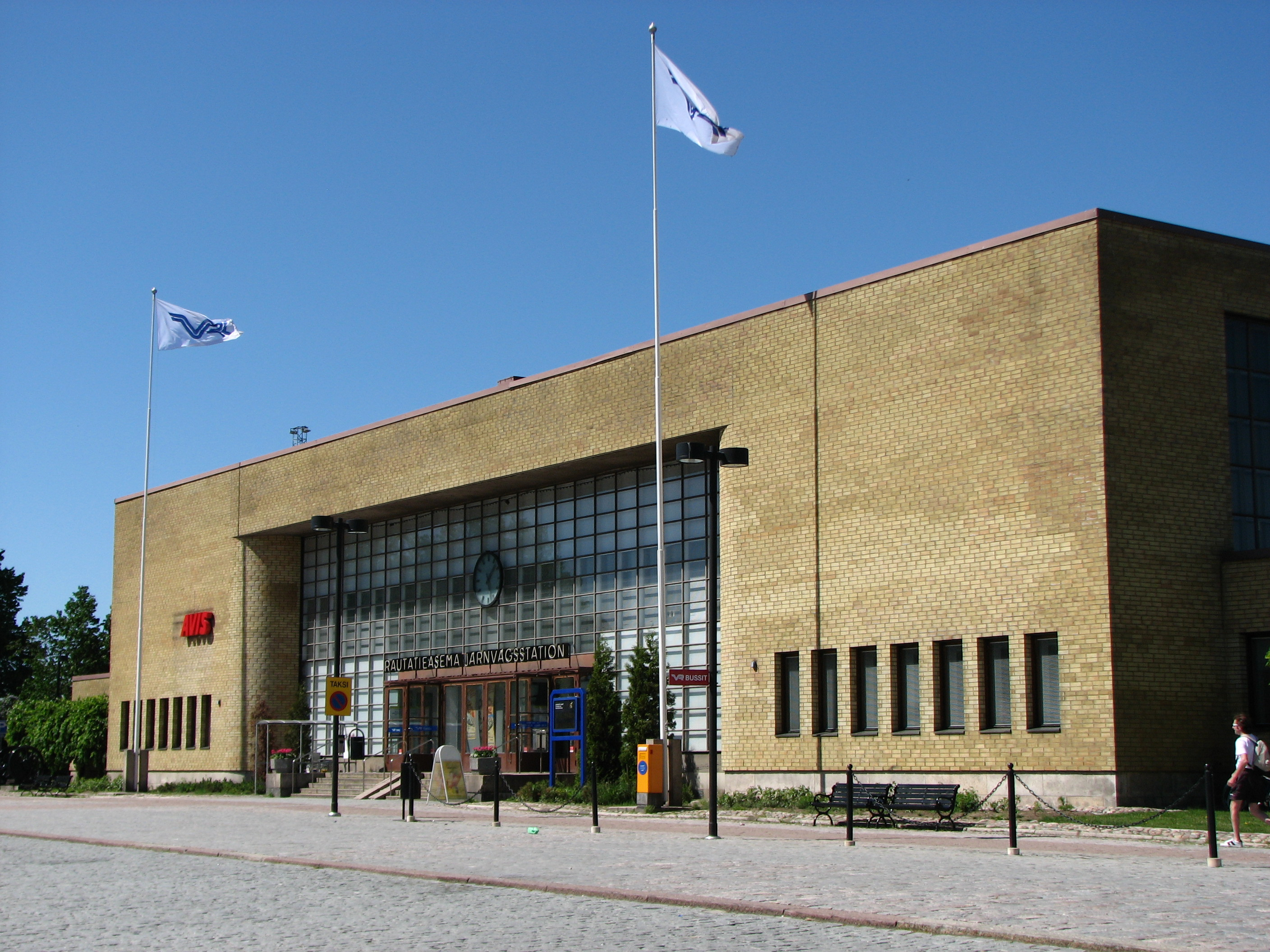
Turku Central railway station, 1940

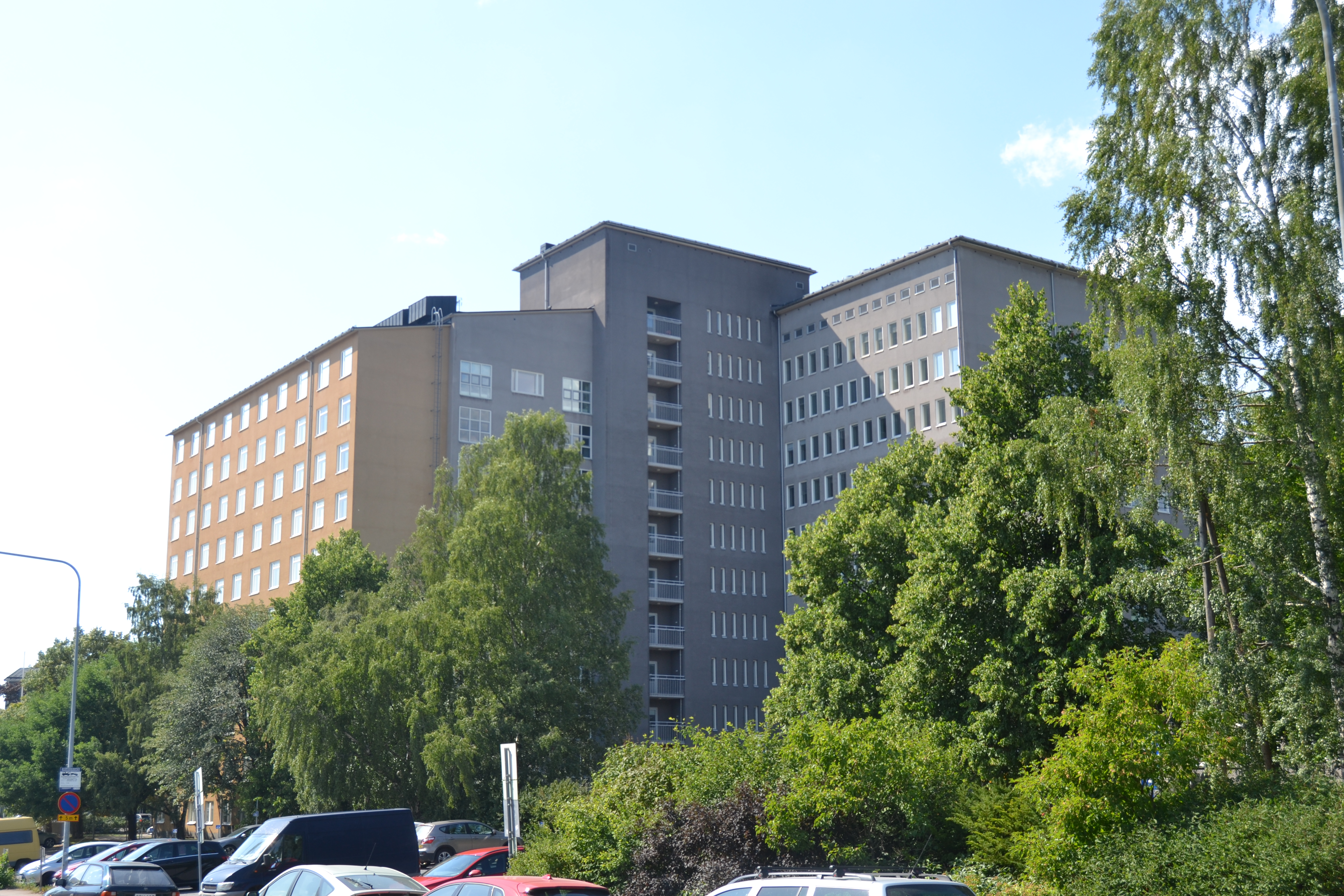
"Kätilöopisto" Maternity Hospital, Helsinki, 1960

Välikangas designed approximately 170 projects. His most notable work is the Puu-Käpylä [‘wood Käpylä’] Garden Suburb in Käpylä on the then northern edge of Helsinki, built from 1920 to 1925, a commission he received at the age of 26. Puu-käpylä was a model workers’ housing area, built at a time when there was a bad housing problem for workers in the city. The construction follows the typical Finnish vernacular method: square-log construction then faced in weatherboarding. However, the whole process was partly industrialized, and the area is regarded as the first prefabricated housing area in Finland. The mostly 2-storey semi-detached timber houses are arranged around sheltered courtyards, where originally the tenants’ vegetable gardens were sited. The colours vary slightly from one house to another, but with a dominance of traditional red ochre. Käpylä was threatened with demolition in the 1960s, and even Välikangas himself drew up plans for the wooden housing to be replaced by a multi-storey development. The area has survived, however, though the working-class families are gradually being replaced by middle-class families and professional types, especially architects – and it also has become a favourite tourist attraction.

The Olympic Games were due to take place in Helsinki, in 1940 (but were cancelled due to the Second World War, to be held eventually in Helsinki in 1952), and Välikangas participated in the design of the Olympic Village, together with architect Hilding Ekelund. Välikangas also designed the Olympic Riding Hall.

Other buildings designed by Välikangas in Helsinki include: large apartment blocks Sturenkatu 40 (1926–27) and Hauhontie 4-8 (1924–25), the Helsinki V school (Apollonkatu 11), and apartment blocks at Eerikinkatu 15, Vuorikatu 9 and on Abrahaminkatu. Cinema theatre Orion (Eerikinkatu 15) represents a fine Art Deco interior.

Välikangas also designed a number of buildings in his home province, especially in the town of Mikkeli: the gate building of the Sports Park (1934), the bus station (1934), Harju Chapel (1937), an extension to the Päämaja School (1937), the Jama Commercial building and civic defence building (1938), and Savings Bank building (1940); and in the county of Savo: the Savonlinna Central Hospital, the Parkumäki Memorial (1929), and the Koikkala Church in Juva (1959).

In 1940, Välikangas and fellow architect Väinö Vähäkallio designed the 1940 Turku Central railway station.

== See also ==
- Ursa Observatory
