= Heikki Oja =

Heikki Oja (born 20 May 1945 in Helsinki, Finland) is a Finnish docent of astronomy, Doctor of Philosophy and the former director of the almanac office of the University of Helsinki.

== Scientific career ==
Oja served as the director of the almanac office of the University of Helsinki from 1994 to 2012 having previously served as a representative of the almanac office since the late 1970s. He was one of the people who initiated the project for the Heureka science centre. Oja has written dozens of informative books accessible for the general public and has appeared on the radio explaining about astronomy and space research. He has been awarded the rank of professor.

== Organisational activity ==
Heikki Oja has had a great influence in the development of the Finnish astronomy association Ursa since the 1970s. He has written or edited dozens of Ursa's books either by himself or among others. He was the editorial secretary of the Ursa publication Tähdet ja avaruus for about fifteen years.

== Personal life ==
Heikki Oja lives in Tammela, Finland. His father was the historical researcher and professor Aulis Oja.

== Awards and recognitions ==
- J. V. Snellman prize 1985
- Warelius prize of the Association of Finnish Scientific Writers 2003
- Finnish State Prize for information publishing 2000, 2014

== Bibliography ==
This list is only a small selection of the works written or edited by Heikki Oja.

- Keskinen, Raimo & Oja, Heikki: Mustaa aukkoa etsimässä. Publications of Ursa 8. Helsinki: Astronomical association Ursa, 1977 (4th edition 1981). ISBN 951-9269-04-5.
- Jännes, Antti & Oja, Heikki: 1982 kun planeetat kohtaavat. Contains 2 parts: Heikki Oja: Planeetat kohtaavat; Antti Jännes: 'Planeetat ja kohtalomme. Publications of Ursa 10. Helsinki: Astronomical association Ursa, 1978. ISBN 951-9269-06-1.
- Oja, Heikki & Vilhu, Osmi (ed.): Albert Einstein: Tutkija ja ihminen. Publications of Ursa 11. Helsinki: Astronomical association Ursa, 1979. ISBN 951-9269-07-X.
- Mattila, Kalevi & Oja, Heikki (ed.): Uusia ikkunoita maailmankaikkeuteen. Publications of Ursa 20. Helsinki: Astronomical association Ursa, 1983. ISBN 951-9269-21-5.
- Kyröläinen, Arja & Oja, Heikki (ed.): Tähtitaivaan arvoituksia. Publications of Ursa 23. Helsinki: Astronomical association Ursa, 1984. ISBN 951-9269-24-X.
- Valtonen, Mauri & Oja, Heikki (ed.): Maapallo ja avaruus. Publications of Ursa 25. Helsinki: Astronomical association Ursa, 1984. ISBN 951-9269-27-4.
- Ideasta kirjahyllyyn eli Miten voin julkaista ja myydä yleistajuisen tiedekirjan tämän päivän Suomessa – ja säilyä hengissä. Helsinki: Association of scientific societies, 1987. ISBN 951-47-0409-6.
- Tähtien taakse. Helsinki: WSOY, 1987. ISBN 951-0-14680-3.
- Kakkuri, Juha & Oja, Heikki & Anttila, Reino: Auringonpimennykset. Publications of Ursa 40. Helsinki: Ursa, 1989. ISBN 951-9269-51-7.
- Oja, Heikki: Avaruuden tähtitarha. Helsinki: WSOY, 1993 (3rdf edition 1998). ISBN 951-0-19033-0.
- (ed.): Seti: Vieraan älyn etsintä. Based on the publications of the Seti seminar held in 1993. Publications of Ursa 52. Helsinki: Astronomical association Ursa, 1994. ISBN 951-9269-73-8.
- Aikakirja. Helsinki: Otava, 1999. ISBN 951-1-16334-5. Online edition: Aikakirja 2013 (PDF) (6th edition) Almanac office of the University of Helsinki.
- Feiring, Sami & Oja, Heikki: Päivien kirja. Helsinki: Otava, 2000. ISBN 951-1-16885-1.
- Saturnuksen taakse: 1990-luvun löytöretket aurinkokunnassamme. Publications of Ursa 74. Helsinki: Astronomical association Ursa, 2000. ISBN 952-5329-07-0.
- Jäinen lohikäärme. Portti series of books. Tampere: Science Fiction society of Tampere, 2001. ISBN 952-5211-06-1.
- Sibeliuksesta Tuonelaan: Aurinkokuntamme kiehtova nimistö. Publications of Ursa 85. Helsinki: Astronomical association Ursa, 2003. ISBN 952-5329-25-9.
- Oja, Heikki & Palviainen, Asko: Maailmankaikkeus 2005: Tähtitieteen vuosikirja. Helsinki: Astronomical association Ursa, 2004. ISBN 952-5329-36-4.
- Oja, Heikki & Palviainen, Asko: Maailmankaikkeus 2007: Tähtitieteen vuosikirja. Helsinki: Astronomical association Ursa, 2006.
- Polaris: Koulun tähtitieto. Publications of Ursa 50. – 7th revised edition. Helsinki: Astronomical association Ursa, 2004. ISBN 978-952-5329-75-9.
- Aurinkokunta uusiksi. Publications of Ursa 110. Helsinki: Astronomical association Ursa, 2008. ISBN 978-952-5329-72-8.
- Suomen kansan pyhimyskalenteri. Helsinki: Kirjapaja, 2011. ISBN 978-952-247-189-5.
