= Mannerheim Museum =

Biographical museum in Helsinki, Finland

Coordinates: 60°09′31.9″N 024°57′37.6″E

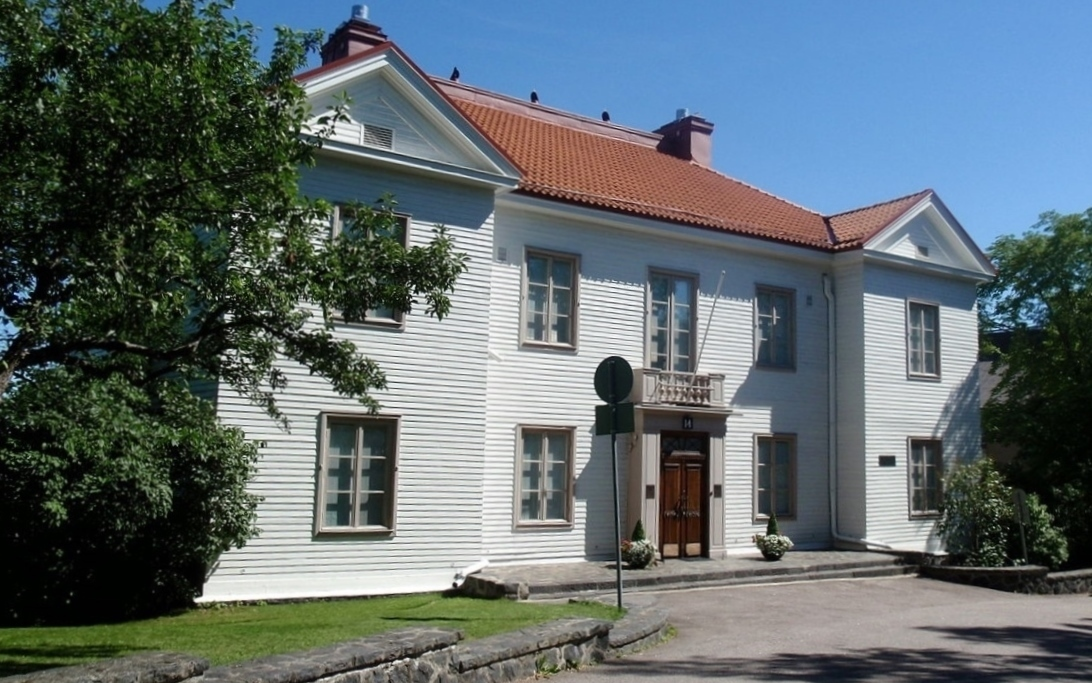
The Mannerheim Museum in Kaivopuisto, Helsinki.

The Mannerheim Museum is located in Helsinki, Finland. It is dedicated to preserving and displaying items related to the life and times of Marshal C. G. E. Mannerheim, a Finnish statesman and military officer. The Mannerheim Museum is located on top of a hill in a prestigious residential area next to the Kaivopuisto park in Helsinki. The building was the home of Mannerheim from 1924 to 1951. With the exception of a few rooms that have been converted for exhibition purposes, his home has been preserved in its original state.

== History of the building ==
The building was originally constructed in 1874 and became known as the Boman Villa, after its first owner. It was the home of Mannerheim from 1924 until his death in 1951, although he never actually owned it, but rented it from the industrialist Karl Fazer. Prior to his tenancy it had been divided into six separate flats for workers in Fazer's chocolate factory, and Mannerheim had to have major alterations made before he could move in. He attached great importance to his home, which is reflected in the interiors, which he had designed himself right down to the colour schemes and the positioning of the furniture. After Mannerheim's death in 1951 the Mannerheim Foundation continued to rent the house from the Fazer family. The museum was opened later the same year. In 1957 the house was purchased by the foundation.

== Exhibits ==
The museum is a mixture of original furnishing of the building from the early 1940s, and additional material brought in to illustrate the life of Mannerheim and the historical context of the period. Among the notable exhibits is an extensive collection of medals and other honours which Mannerheim received from numerous countries. Also displayed are his numerous hunting trophies, book collection, gifts and portraits of his ancestors. Mannerheim's bedroom, which is kept at its original state, displays the spartan conditions in which he preferred to sleep. The museum also maintains an extensive archive of photographs.

The museum receives approximately 10,000 visitors a year. The entrance fee also includes a guided tour, and it is not possible to visit the museum without a guide. This is because the rooms are actually fairly small, and packed with delicate exhibits. The tours are available in Finnish, Swedish, and English, with other languages possibly available by request.

== See also ==
- Marshal's Cabin (Marskin Maja)
