= Ursa Observatory =

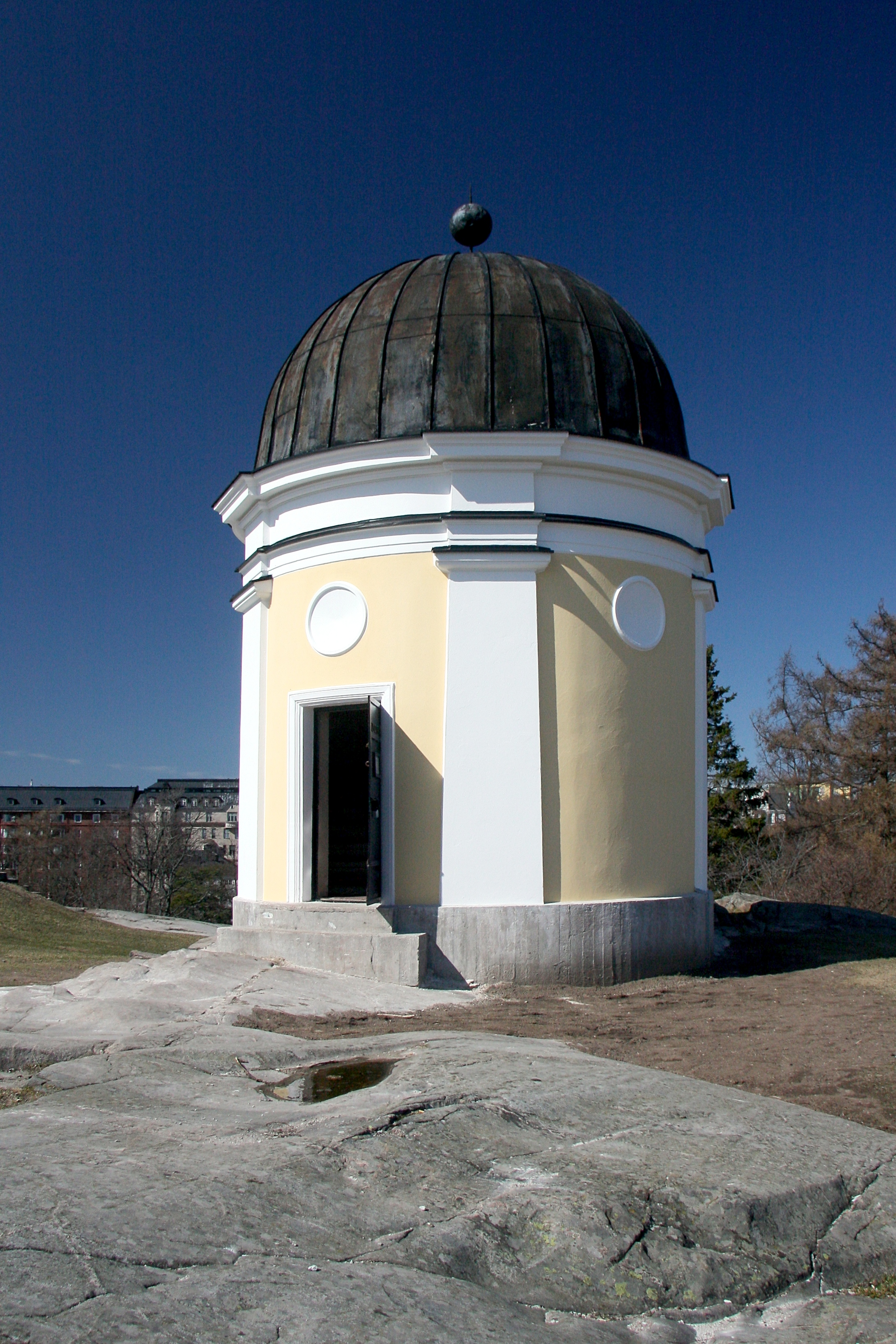
- Alternative names: Kaivopuisto Observatory
- Organization: Ursa
- Location: Kaivopuisto, Helsinki, Finland
- Coordinates: 60°09′19.7″N 024°57′19.5″E
- Established: 1926

Telescopes
- unnamed: Merz refractor
- unnamed: 25 cm Ritchie-Chretien
- unnamed: Celestron 8
- Related media on Commons

The Ursa Observatory (Finnish: Ursan tähtitorni, Swedish: Ursas observatorium) is an astronomical observatory located in the Kaivopuisto park in Helsinki, Finland. The Ursa Astronomical Association observatory, designed by architect Martti Välikangas (1893–1973), was completed in 1926.

== See also ==
- List of astronomical observatories
