= Oya (name) =

- Gender: Feminine
- Language: Turkish

Origin
- Language: Turkish
- Origin: "oymak"
- Derivation: "oya"
- Meaning: "lace", Irish lace", "lagestromia indica"

Other names
- Cognate: Oylum

Ōya
- Language: Japanese

Origin
- Meaning: Depends on kanji; for example, "big arrow", "big house", or "big valley"

Oya is a common feminine Turkish given name. In Turkish, "Oya" means "lace", "Irish lace", and/or "lagestromia indica".

Ōya, also spelled Ohya or Oya, is a Japanese surname. In Japanese, the meaning of the name depends on the kanji used to write it; some ways of writing the name include "big arrow" (大矢), "big house" (大家, 大宅, or 大屋), and "big valley" (大谷).

== People ==
=== Given name ===
- Oya Araslı (born 1943), a Turkish law scholar and politician, and first woman group deputy chairman of Turkey
- Oya Aydoğan (1957–2016), Turkish actress
- Oya Başar (born 1956), Turkish comedy actress
- Oya Baydar (born 1940), Turkish sociologist and writer
- Oya Eczacıbaşı (born 1959), Turkish museum director
- Oya Ekici (born 1975), Turkish para-karateka
- Oya Kayacık (1938–2020), Turkish philanthropist
- Oya Tuzcuoğlu (born 1948), Turkish diplomat

=== Surname ===
- Bruno O'Ya (1933–2002), Polish–Estonian actor
- Goichi Oya (1897–1944), captain in the Imperial Japanese Navy
- Hisakatsu Oya (大矢 健一; born 1964), Japanese wrestler
- José Oya (born 1983), Spanish footballer
- Kana Oya (大屋 夏南; born 1987), Japanese model
- Masaki Oya (athlete) (大家 正喜; born 1966), Japanese runner
- Masaki Oya (大宅 真樹; born 1995), Japanese volleyball player
- Masaya Oya (大箭 将也; born 1992), stylized as Camellia, Japanese musician
- Shinzō Ōya (大屋 晋三; 1894–1980), Japanese entrepreneur and politician
- Shizuka Ōya (大家 志津香; born 1991), Japanese idol
- Sōichi Ōya (大宅 壮一; 1900–1970), Japanese journalist
- Tsubasa Oya (大屋 翼; born 1986), Japanese footballer

== Fictional characters ==
- Oya (comics), a character from Marvel Comics
