= Kvistaberg Observatory =

Astronomical observatory in Sweden

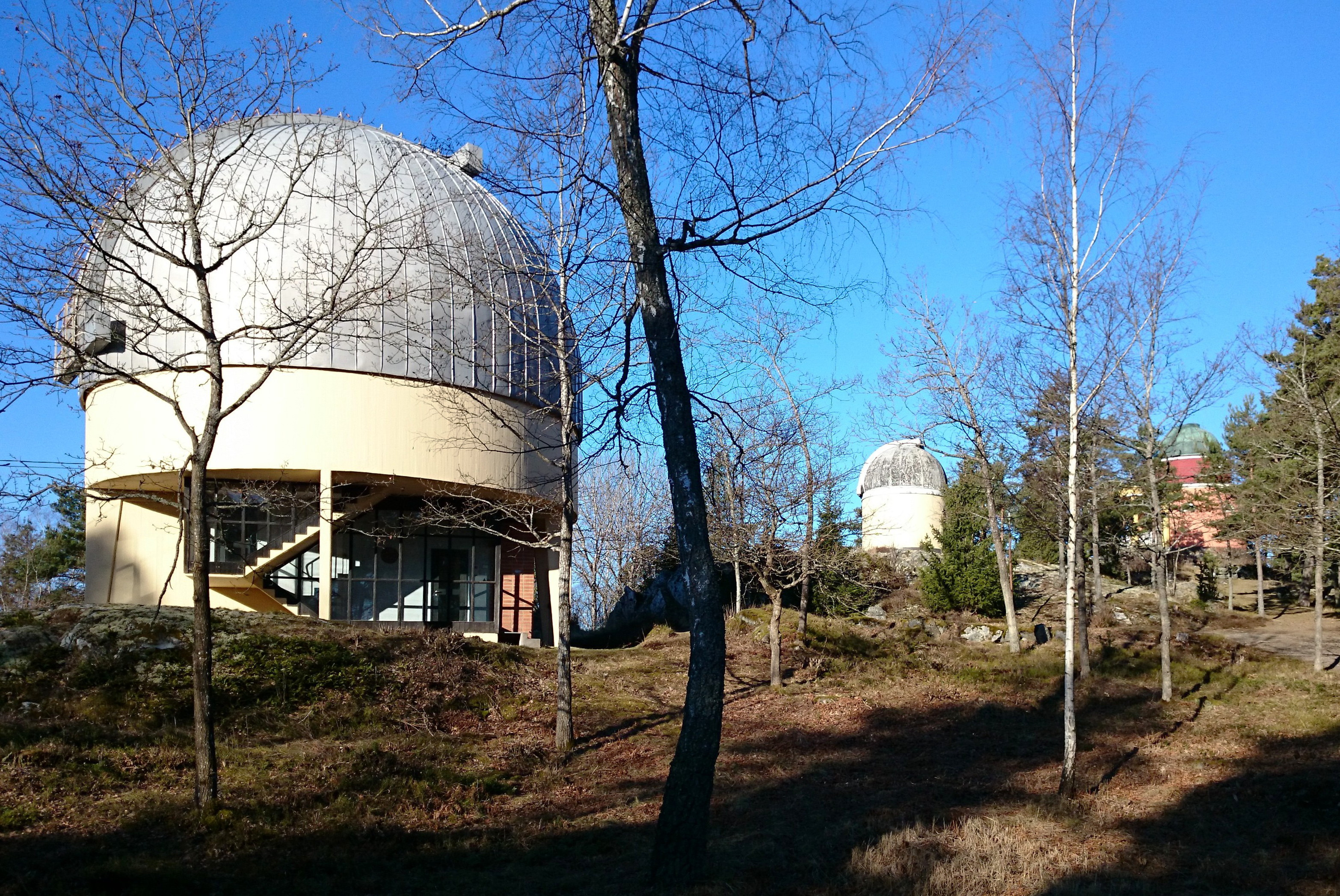
- Organization: Department of Physics and Astronomy at Uppsala University
- Observatory code: 049
- Location: Bro, Sweden
- Coordinates: 59°30′06″N 17°36′24″E
- Established: 1948
- Website: www.astro.uu.se/history/Kvistaberg.html
- Location of Kvistaberg Observatory
- Related media on Commons

The Kvistaberg Station or Kvistaberg Observatory (Swedish: Kvistabergs observatorium; obs. code: 049) was a Swedish astronomical observatory and a station of the Uppsala Astronomical Observatory, which both belong to the Department of Physics and Astronomy at Uppsala University. It is located between the Swedish cities of Uppsala and Stockholm, at almost equal distance. Since 2009, the domes and telescopes of the Kvistaberg Observatory are part of a museum.

The observatory established a 1-meter Schmidt telescope in 1963, which is a large size for this type of telescope designed to give a wide field of view.

== History ==
The observatory was the result of a donation in 1944 from Nils Tamm, an artist who had studied astronomy in his youth under Nils Christoffer Dunér and Östen Bergstrand in Uppsala and remained an avid amateur astronomer throughout his life.

Through the work of professor Åke Wallenquist and professor Gunnar Malmquist at the observatory in Uppsala, the new observatory was fitted out with a large Schmidt telescope (100/135/300 cm) in 1963. Wallenquist became the first director of the observatory (1948–1970) and was succeeded by Tarmo Oja (1970–1999) and later Claes-Ingvar Lagerkvist (1999–2007). The asteroid 3331 Kvistaberg, was named for the astronomical observatory, where hundreds of minor planets had been discovered with the Schmidt telescope between 1975 and 2005.

Around 2004, Uppsala University decided to discontinue active research at the observatory. The property was sold to the municipality of Upplands-Bro, where Kvistaberg is situated. The domes and telescopes are now part of a museum, which was inaugurated in 2009.

== Gallery ==
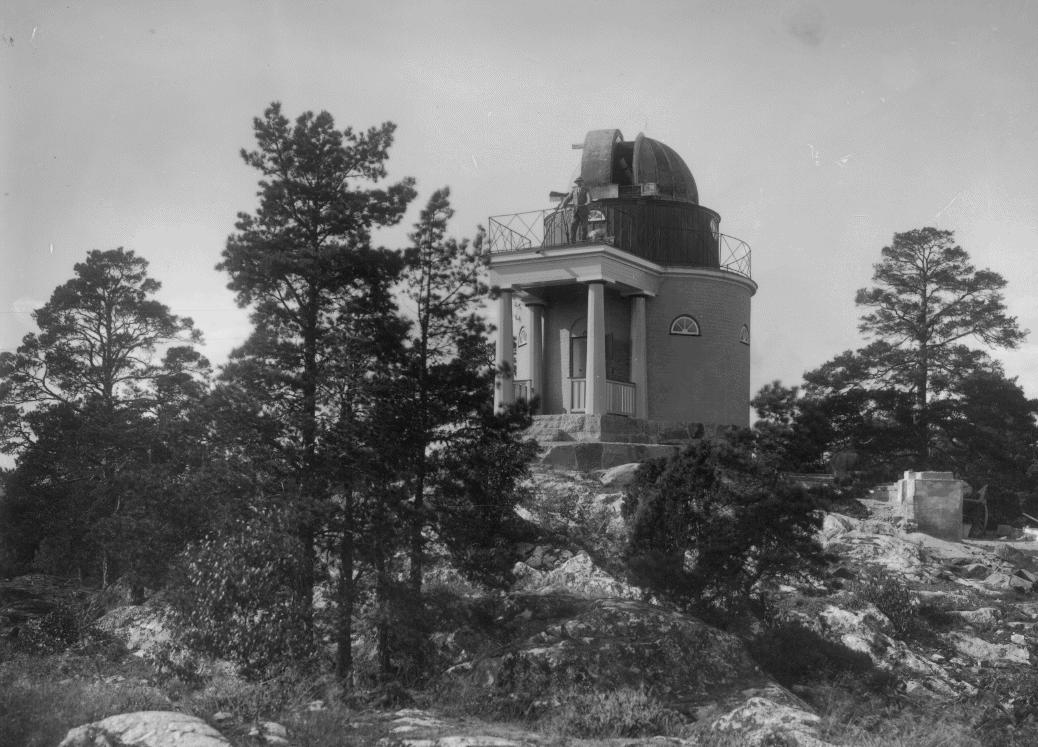
The Kvistaberg Station in 1919

== See also ==
- 2744 Birgitta, asteroid
- 5080 Oja, asteroid
- Uppsala-DLR Asteroid Survey
