= Ursa (Finland) =

Finnish amateur astronomy association

Ursa Astronomical Association
- Tähtitieteellinen yhdistys Ursa ry
- Founded: November 2, 1921
- Purpose: Amateur astronomy
- Location: Helsinki, Finland
- Region served: Finland
- Members: 18,218 (2016)
- Website: www.ursa.fi

Ursa Astronomical Association (Finnish: Tähtitieteellinen yhdistys Ursa ry) is the largest astronomical association in Finland. Ursa was founded on 2 November 1921. Founding members include a renowned Finnish astronomer Yrjö Väisälä. In 1926 Ursa established the Ursa Observatory in Kaivopuisto district of Helsinki. In 2007 the Tähtikallio Observatory & Education Center was established in Artjärvi, its current equipment includes an Astrofox 36" Folded Newtonian Open tube telescope, an Alluna 16" Ritchey-Chrétien telescope, a Meade 16" LX200GPS Schmidt-Cassegrain telescope, a Sky-Watcher ED 120mm refractor telescope fitted with a Baader AstroSolar Solar Filter and a piggybacked Coronado SolarMax 40 H-Alpha telescope. Ursa's primary functions include advancing amateur astronomy and astronomical education. They have published a magazine Tähdet ja avaruus since 1971 and have provided awards to exceptional members of amateur astronomy for significant astronomical observations since 1988. Anyone can join Ursa for an annual fee.

== Sections ==
The organization has thirteen sections specialized in different aspects of amateur astronomy (and meteorology):

- Solar section
- Halo section
- Instrument section
- Atmospheric optical phenomena section
- Clubs and organization
- Lunar, planetary and cometary section
- Mathematics and information technology section
- Meteor section
- Storm chasing section
- Minor planet and occultation section
- Aurora section
- Deep sky section
- Satellite section

In addition, Ursa has two loosely organized hobby groups:

- Variable stars
- Observation conditions

== See also ==
- List of astronomical societies
