= Oylum =

- Gender: Feminine
- Language: Turkish

Origin
- Language: Turkish
- Origin: "oylum"
- Derivation: "oylum"
- Meaning: "volume", "dimension", "depth"

Other names
- Cognate: Oya

Oylum is a common feminine Turkish given name. In Turkish, "Oylum" means "volume" "dimension", and/or "depth".

== People ==
=== Given name ===
- Oylum Öktem, a Turkish model, actor, and fashion designer and daughter of Tankut Öktem.
- Oylum Şahin, a Turkish actor, and radio personality.
- Oylum Talu, a Turkish television presenter and anchor person of Habertürk (see Turkish Wikipedia article).
- Oylum Yılmaz, a Turkish author, journalist and literary critic .

=== Surname ===
- Rıza Oylum, a Turkish journalist writing for BirGün.
