= Kaivohuone =

Restaurant in Helsinki, Finland

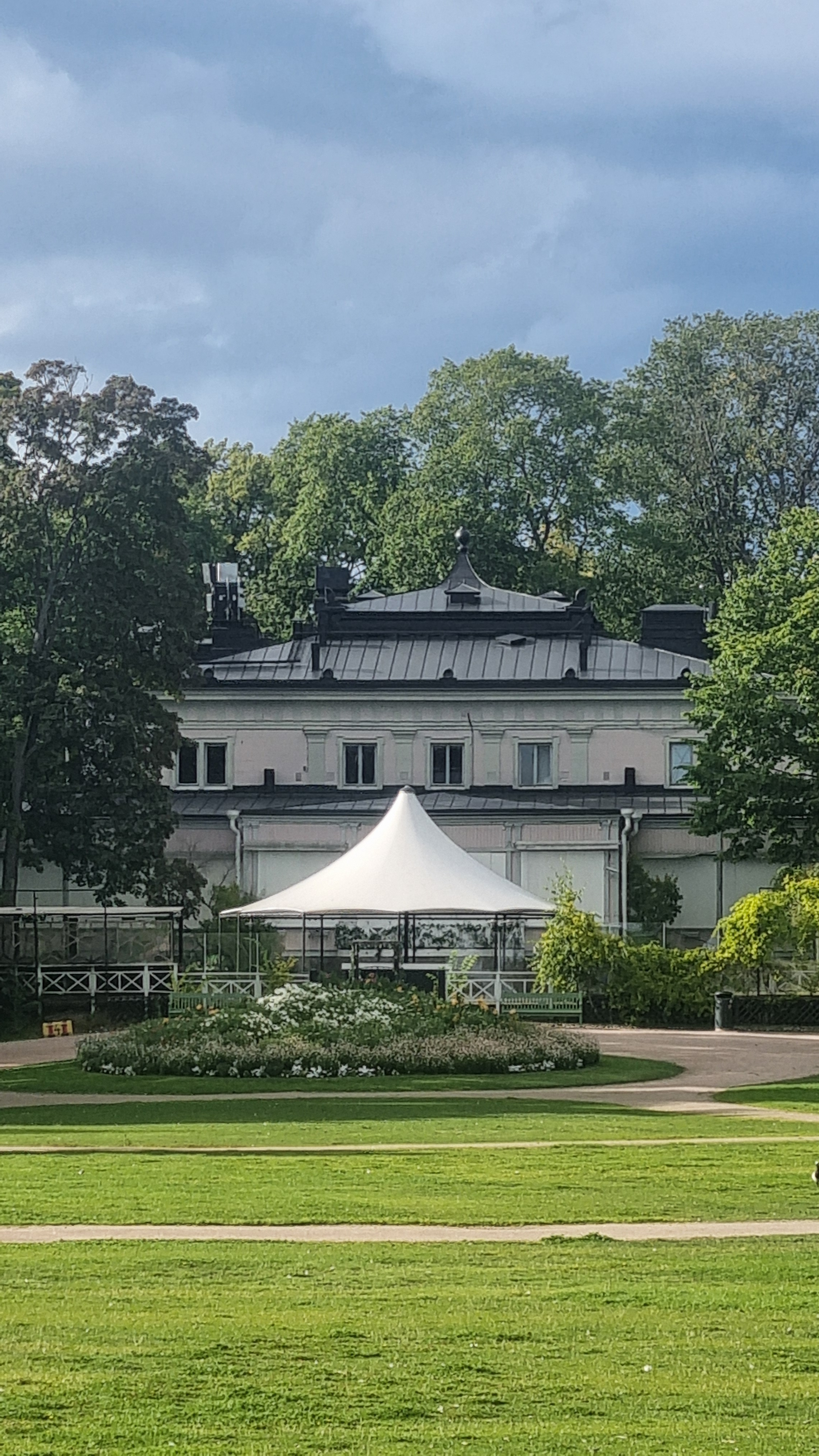
- Kaivohuone in 2025.
- Interactive map of Kaivohuone
- Address: Iso Puistotie 1
- Location: Kaivopuisto, Helsinki, Finland
- Coordinates: 60°09′27.14″N 024°57′21.31″E
- Type: villa, restaurant, nightclub

Construction
- Built: 1838
- Architect: Carl Ludvig Engel

Website
- www.kaivohuone.fi/en/

Kaivohuone (also abbreviated as Kaivo) is a restaurant in Helsinki, Finland. It is located in the middle of Kaivopuisto Park on the Iso Puistotie street, about one and a half kilometers south of the Market Square. The restaurant features a large outdoor terrace, and in the summer, popular nightclubs performing by top artists are organized in the restaurant, which are especially popular on Wednesdays and Saturdays.

== History ==
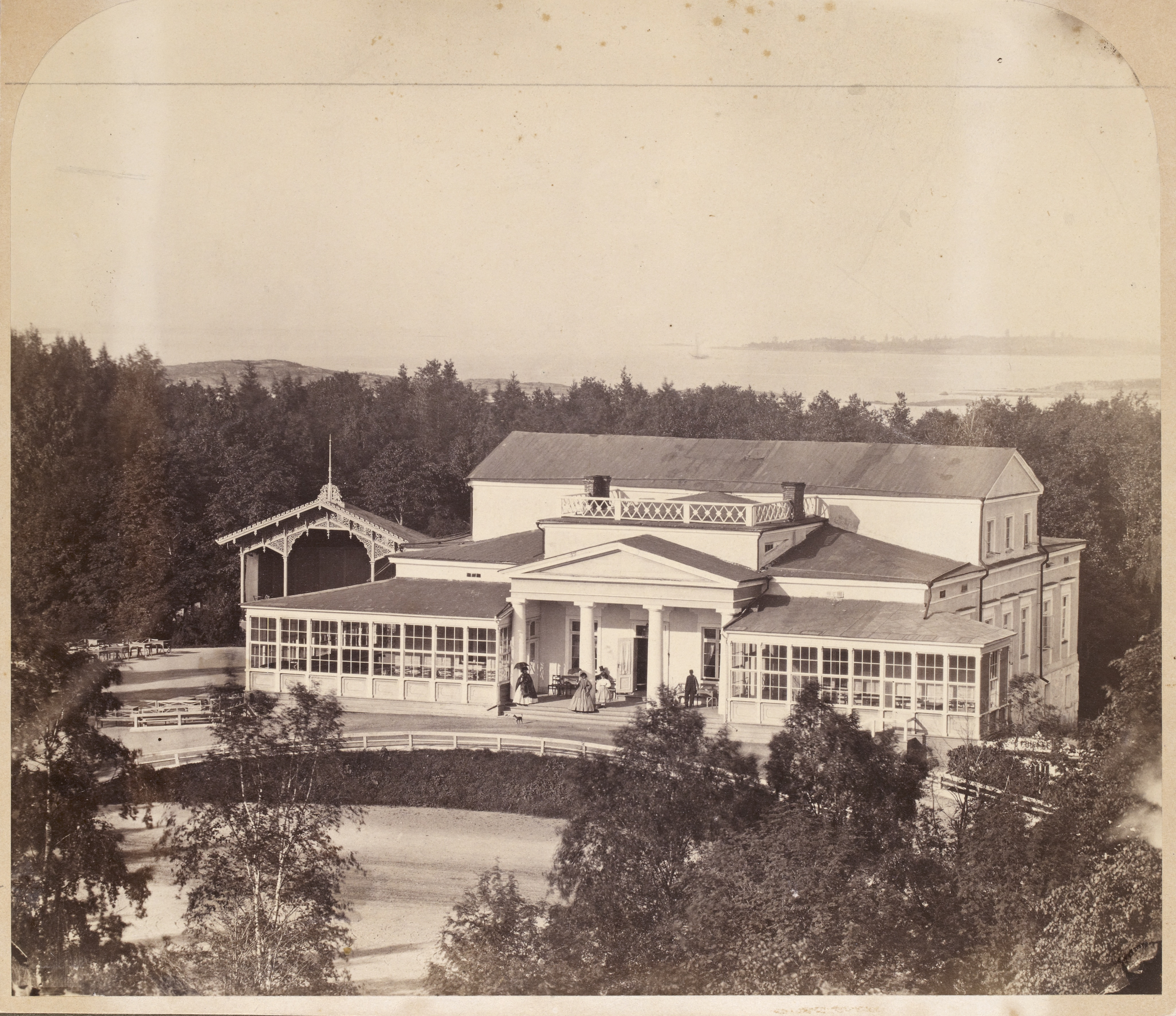
Kaivohuone in the 1860s

The villa-styled house was built in 1838 and it was designed by German architect Carl Ludvig Engel. Initially opened for restaurant use, Kaivohuone was one of the first restaurants in Helsinki. Once upon a time, Kaivohuone also hosted circus arts and cabaret, among other things, and Kaivohuone was one of the most important centers of Helsinki's entertainment venues in the 19th century.

In the 19th century, Kaivopuisto attracted vacationing Russian nobles who were not allowed to travel abroad to have fun. Kaivopuisto's spa became a popular holiday destination for St. Petersburg's social circles, and Helsinki became a cosmopolitan spa town for a couple of decades.

== See also ==
- Tavastia Club
