= Tarmo Oja =

Swedish astronomer (1934–2024)

Tarmo Oja (21 December 1934 – 18 November 2024) was an Estonian-born Swedish professor in astronomy at Uppsala University who studied galactic structure and variable stars. He was the director at the Swedish Kvistaberg Station of the Uppsala Observatory from 1970 until his retirement in 1999.

As a senior professor he continued his work at the observatory at Kvistaberg until the spring of 2006, when he returned to Uppsala together with his wife Silvi. Oja died on 18 November 2024, at the age of 89.

== Awards and honors ==
- In 2001, Estonian President Lennart Meri awarded Oja the Order of the White Star V Class for his contribution to science.
- The asteroid 5080 Oja, discovered at the Kvistaberg Station, was named in his honor in 1992.
