= Kaivopuisto =

Coordinates: 60°09′25″N 24°57′25″E

Kaivopuisto Brunnsparken
- Helsinki Subdivision
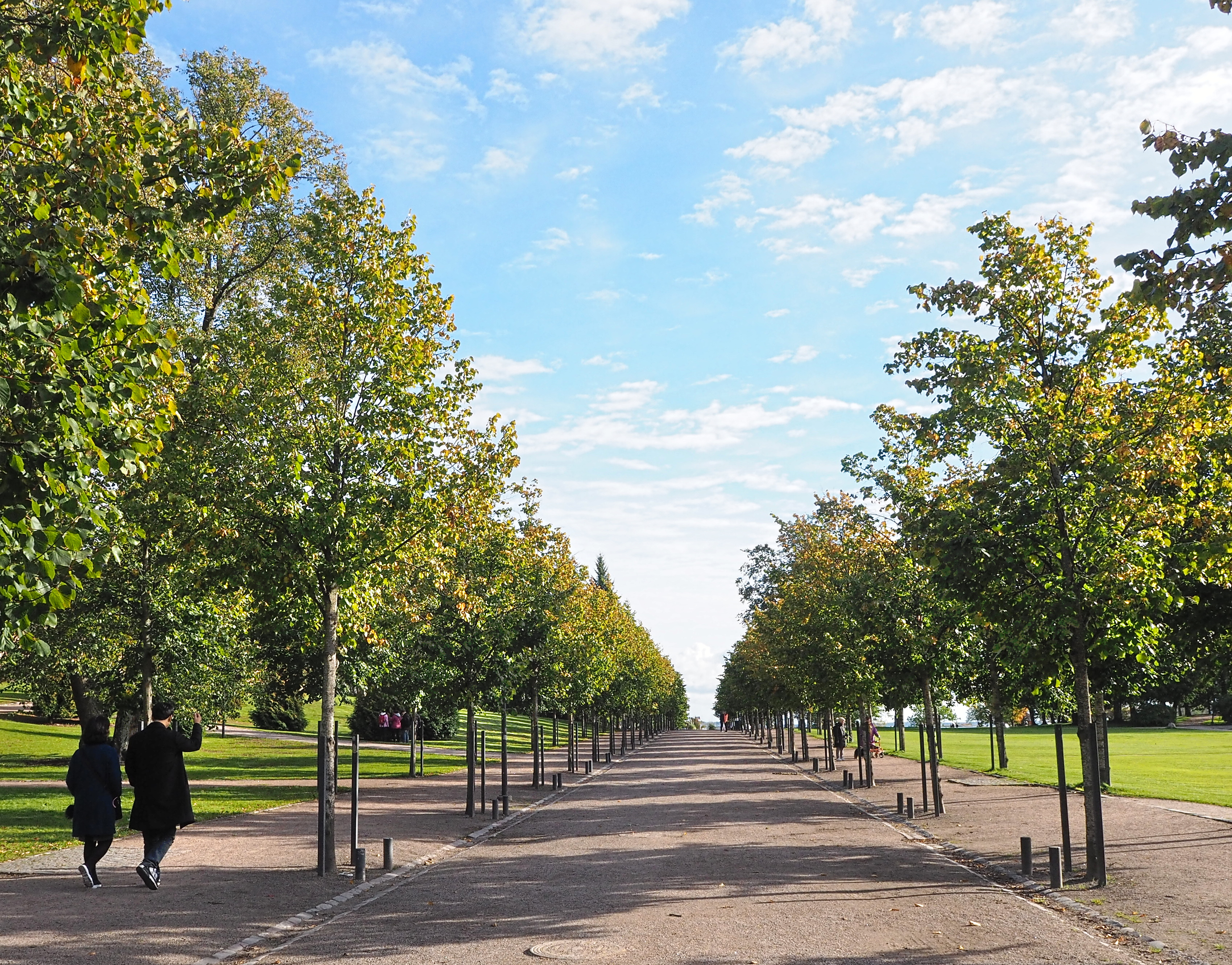

- Position of Kaivopuisto within Helsinki
- Country: Finland
- Region: Uusimaa
- Sub-region: Greater Helsinki
- Municipality: Helsinki
- District: Southern
- Subdivision regions: none
- Area: 0.45 km^{2} (0.17 sq mi)
- Population (2004): 491
  - Density: 1,091/km^{2} (2,830/sq mi)
- Postal codes: 00140
- Subdivision number: 09
- Neighbouring subdivisions: Ullanlinna

Kaivopuisto (Swedish: Brunnsparken), nicknamed Kaivari in Finnish or Brunsan in Swedish, is one of the oldest and best known parks in central Helsinki, Finland, and also a neighbourhood of about 500 inhabitants where the park is located.

== Geography ==
To the south, Kaivopuisto borders the Gulf of Finland. To the north is a residential area containing the official private residences of several ambassadors of foreign countries to Finland, including the United States, Estonia, Spain, France, Belgium, Brazil, Italy, the Netherlands, and the United Kingdom.

== History ==
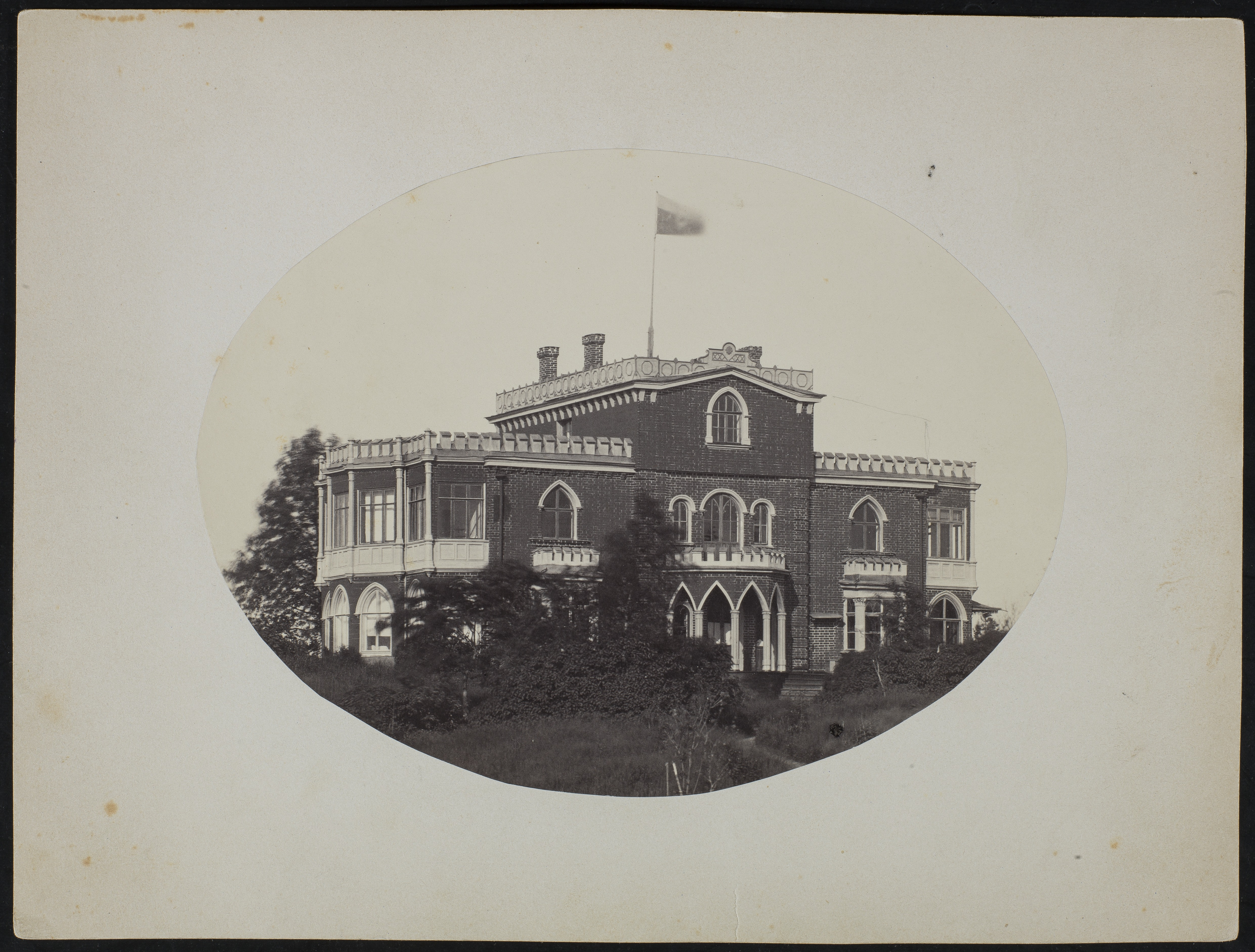
Villa Rauhaniemi.

In Kaivopuisto is located the Marshal Mannerheim home museum.

== Description ==
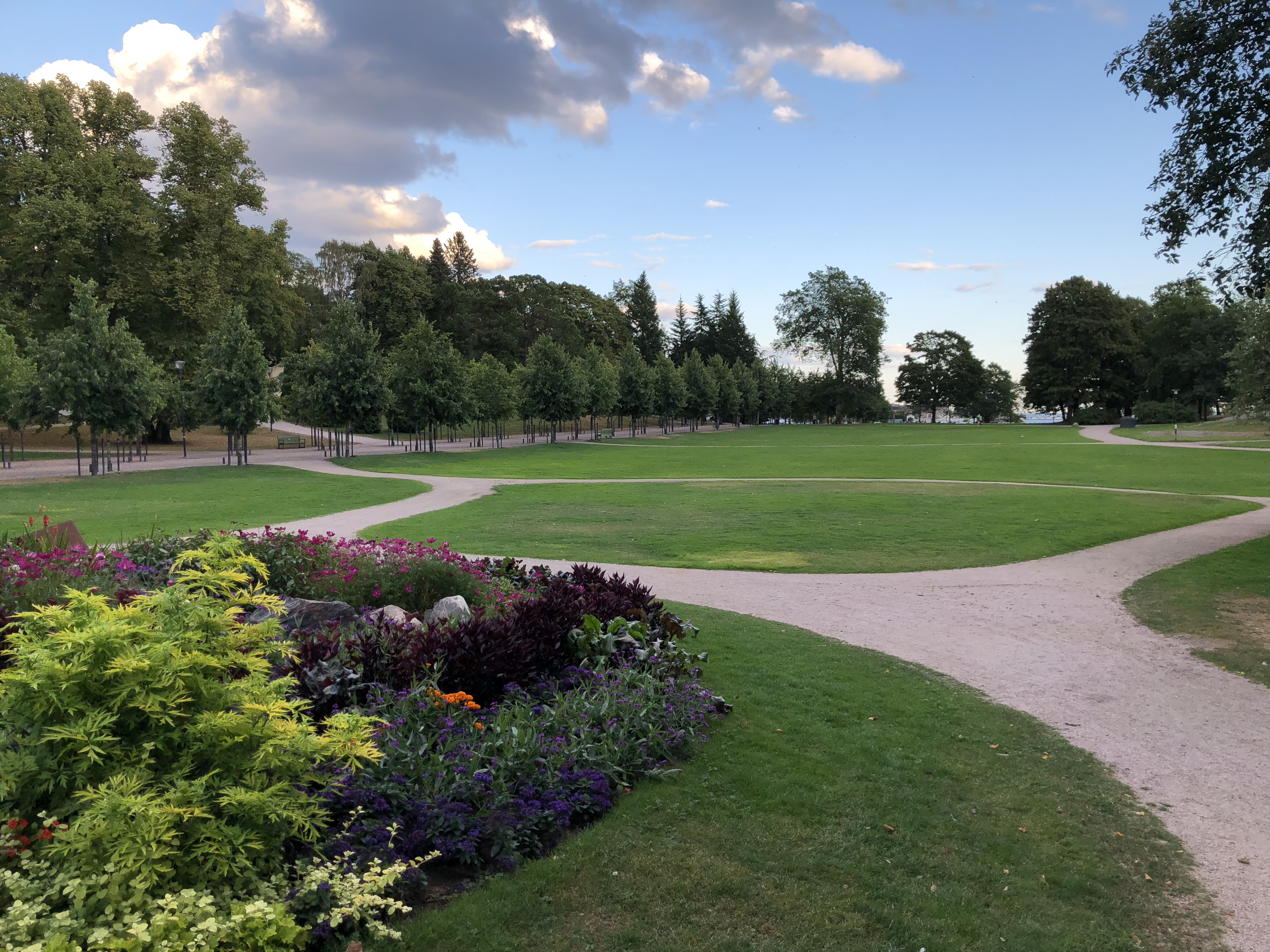
Kaivopuisto.

Kaivopuisto offers several hectares of parks, both on flat ground, and on cliffs. The park also includes traces of stone fortifications built in the 18th century. Every summer, thousands of Helsinkians come to Kaivopuisto to sunbathe, to have picnics, or to hold sport. The largest hill in the park is a favoured slope for tobogganing during the winter.

The height of Kaivopuisto's popularity is on Vappu day (1 May), immediately after the preceding Walpurgis Night celebrations in the city centre. On Vappu, Kaivopuisto is packed with tens of thousands of Helsinkians, who come to have a picnic with their friends and families. Fanciful costumes, loud music, and excessive consumption of alcoholic beverages is the routine for a Vappu picnic. It is customary for all attendants who have graduated from the Finnish matriculation exam to wear their student caps at the picnic. A yellowed student cap is taken as a sign of prestige.

Since the mid-1970s, it has been common to hold a few concerts in the park during the summer, with classical music, but more often pop and rock music, and usually featuring Finnish artists.

Kaivopuisto also includes Kaivohuone, a famous restaurant and nightclub dating from the 1830s, the Ursa Observatory, and the Villa Kleineh, the oldest villa in the area.

In 2020, traditional May Day festivities in Kaivopuisto were cancelled in favor of online events.

== Gallery ==
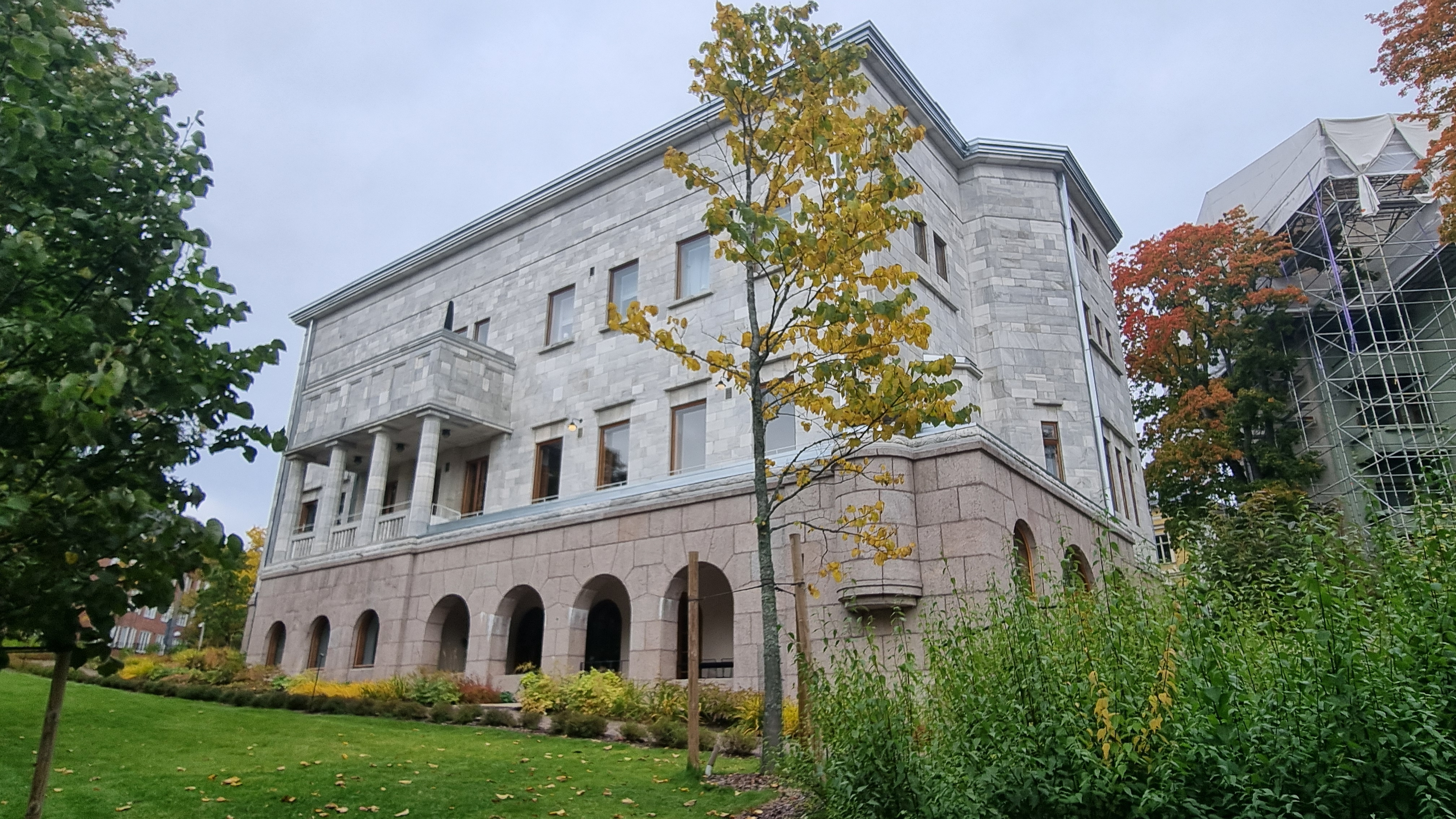
The Marble Palace.

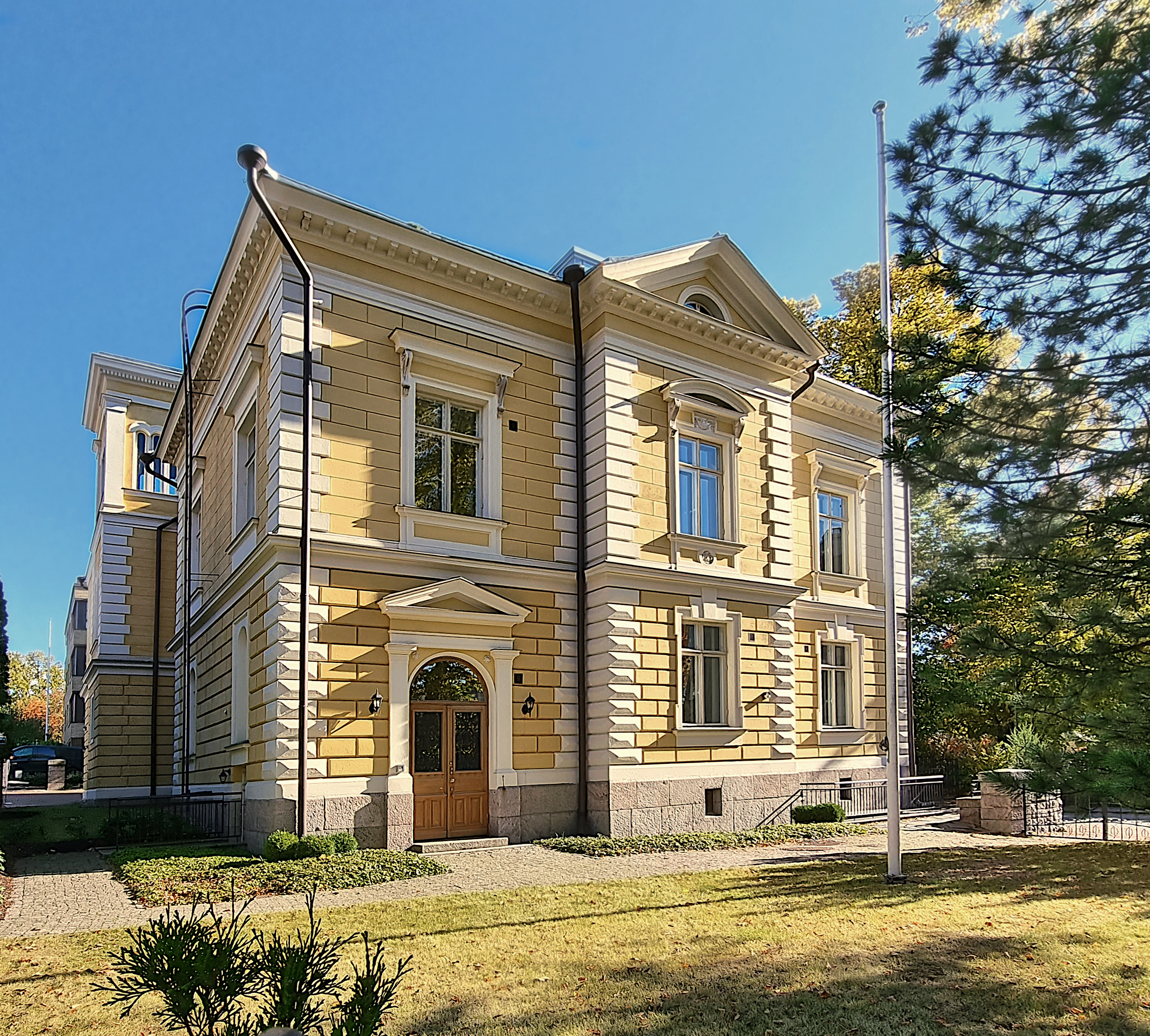
Itäinen puistotie 2.

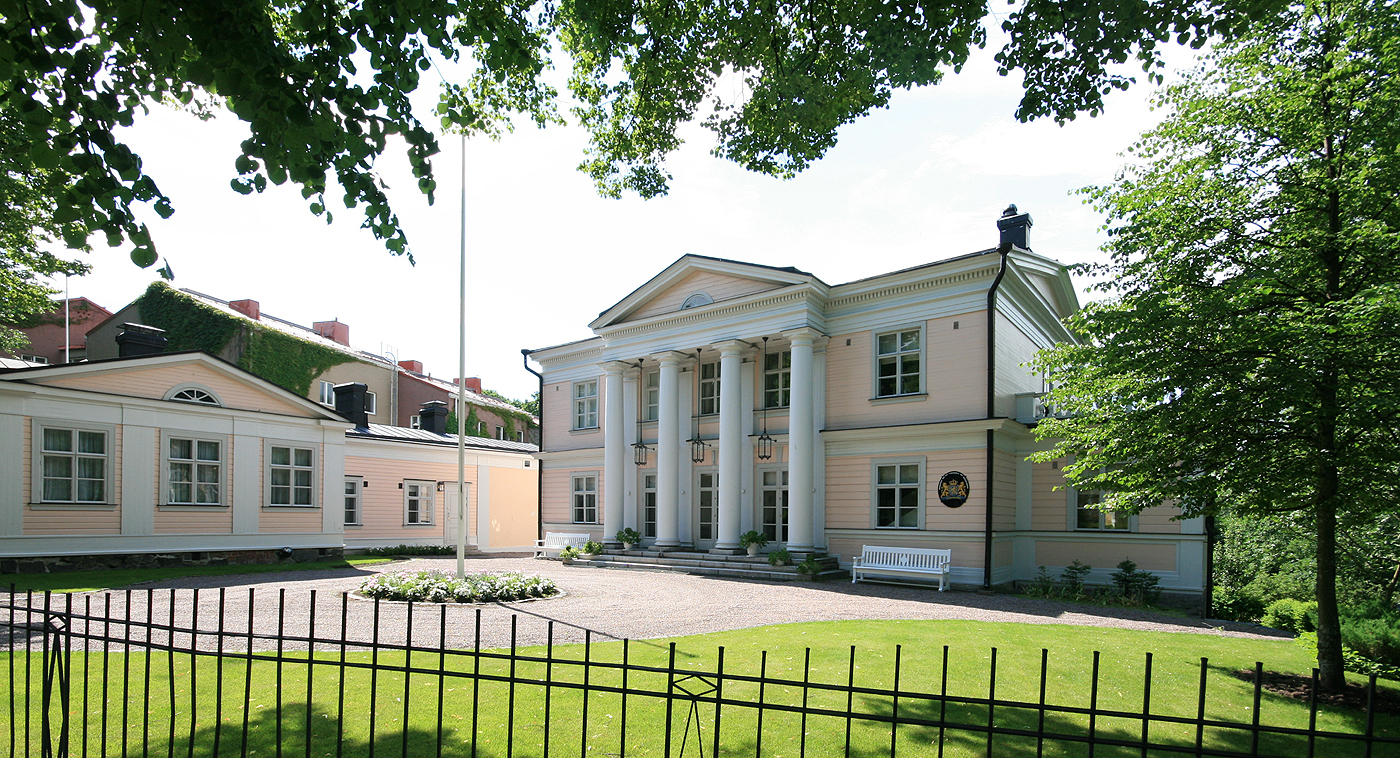
Villa Kleineh.

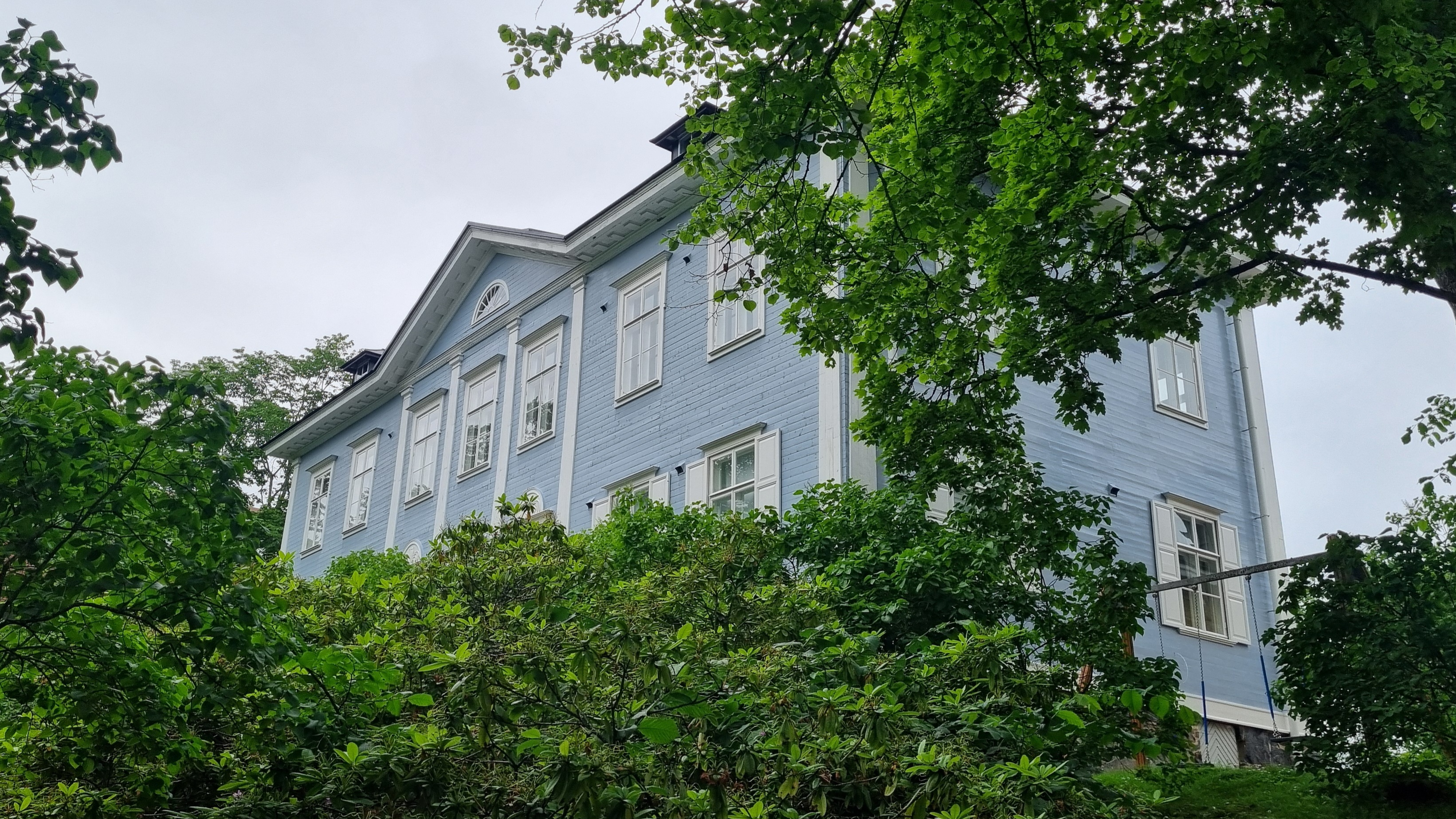
Itäinen puistotie 8.

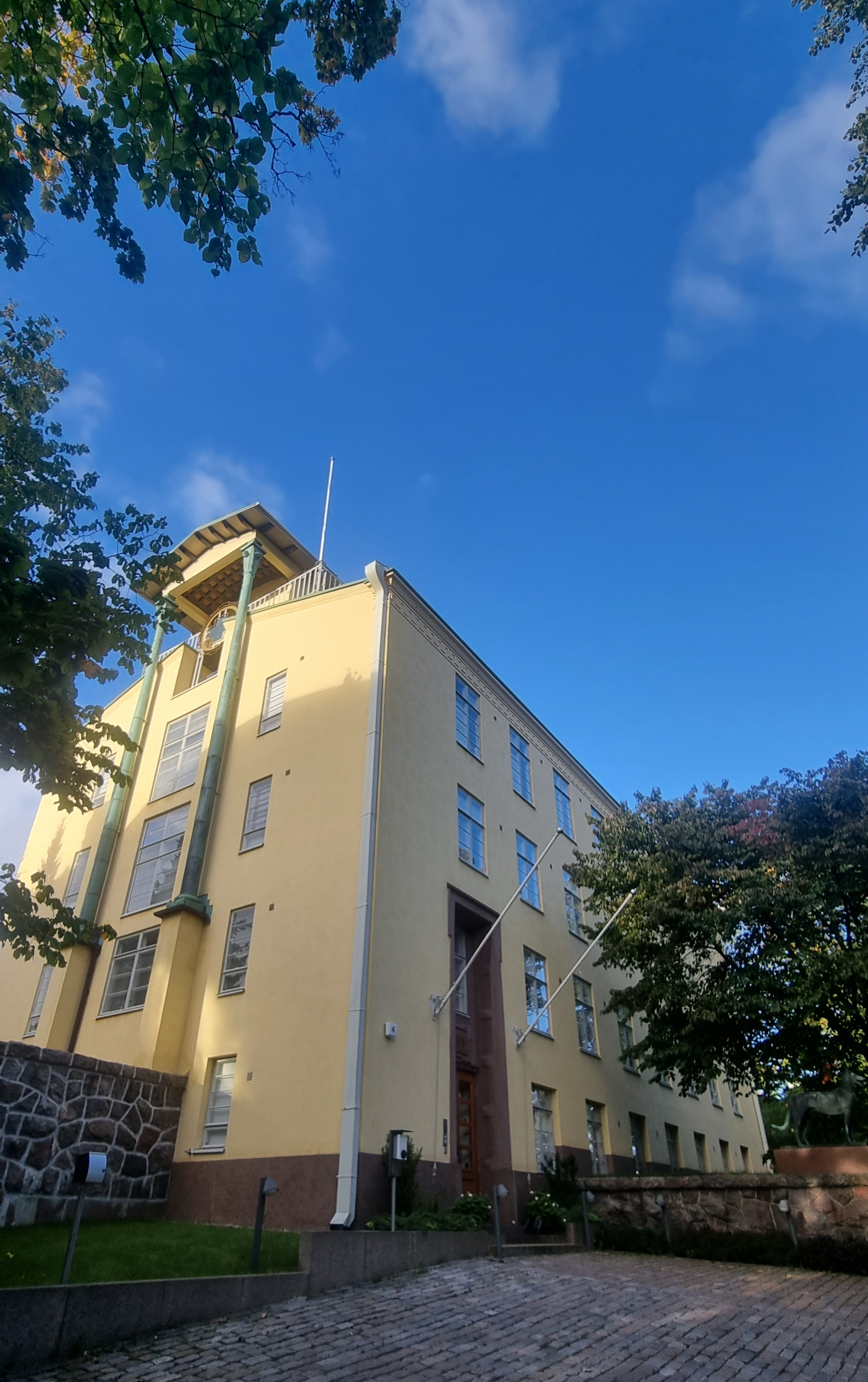
Kalliolinnantie 4.

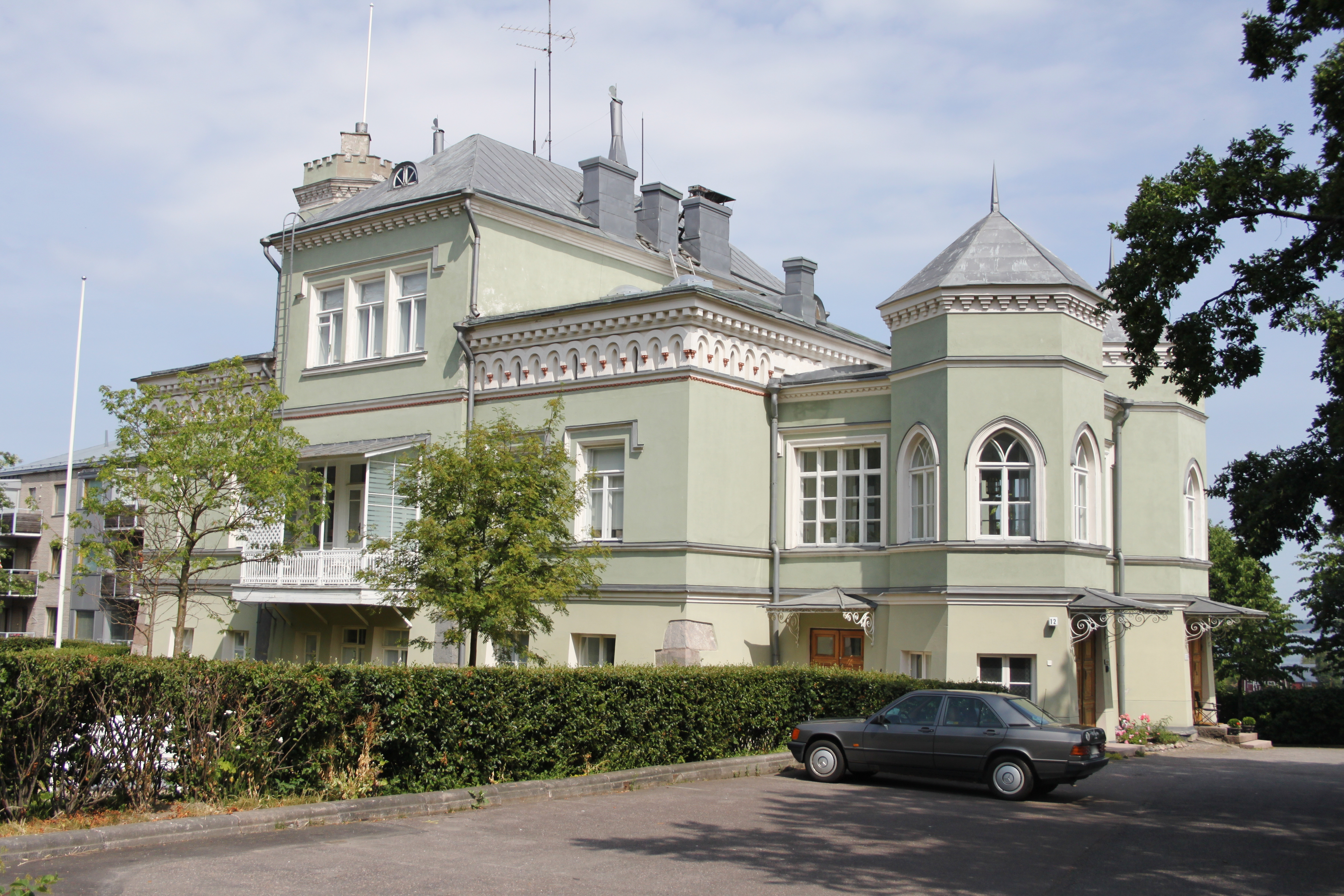
Kalliolinna.

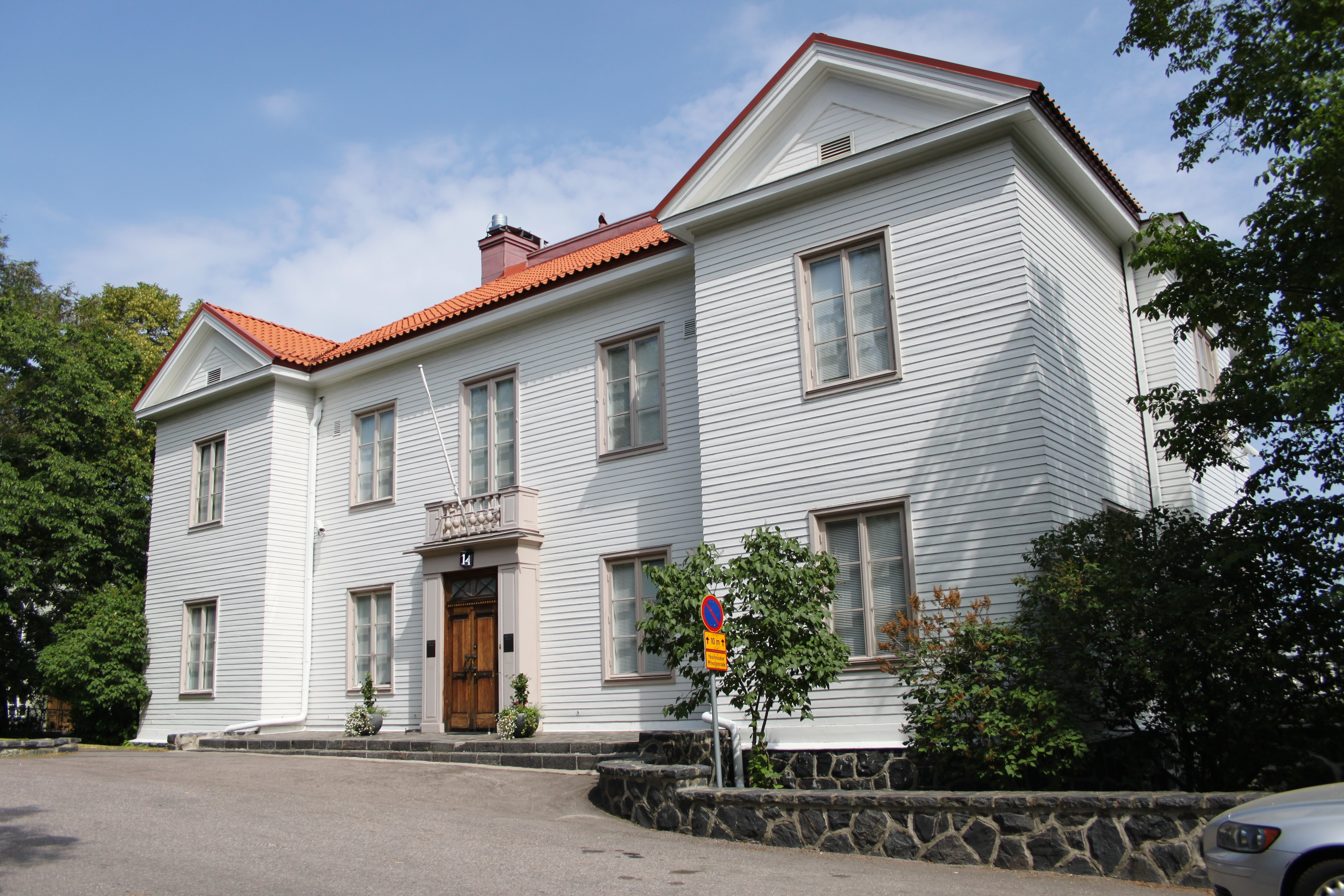
Mannerheim Museum.

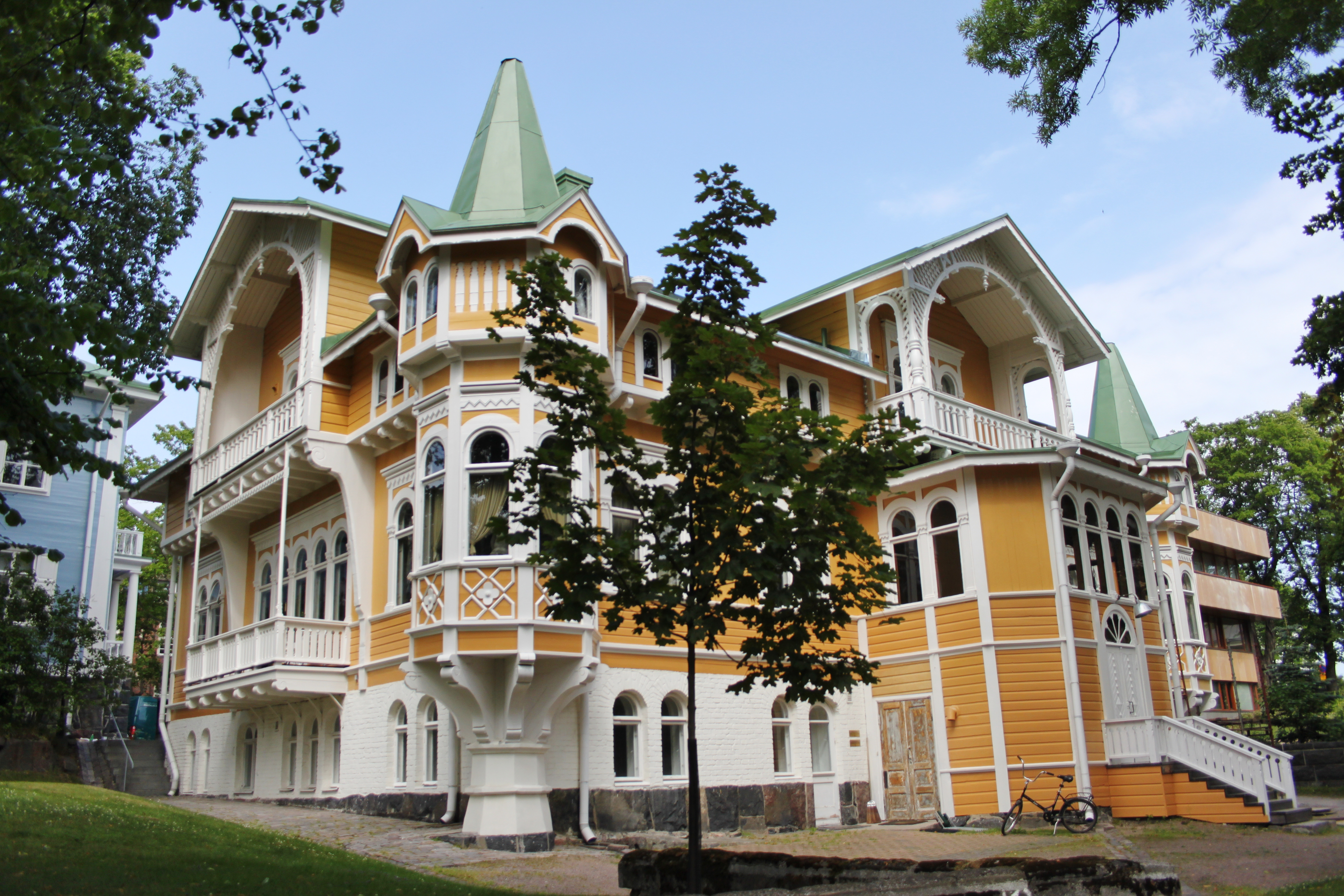
Kalliolinnantie 7.

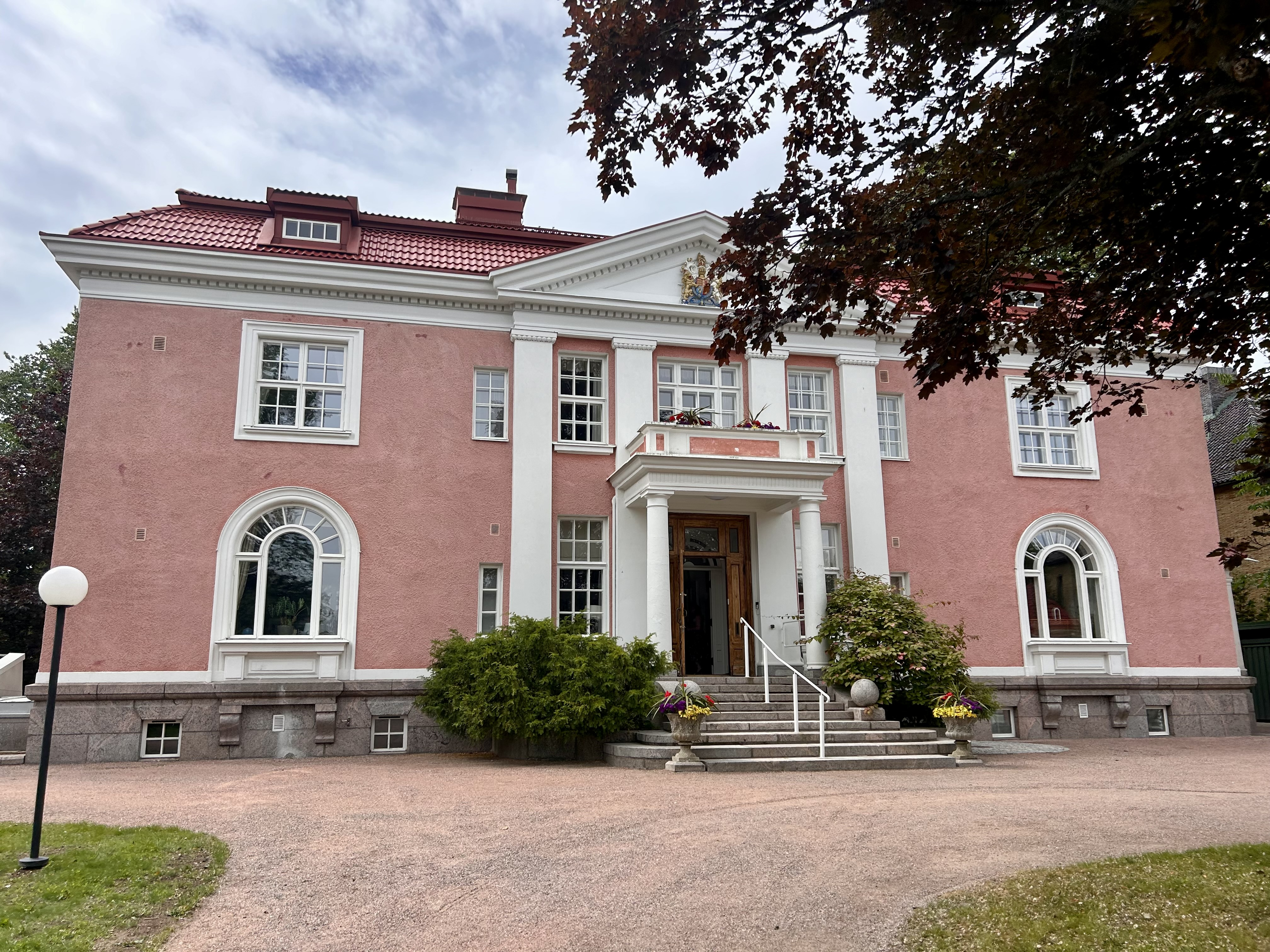
The British Embassy in Helsinki.

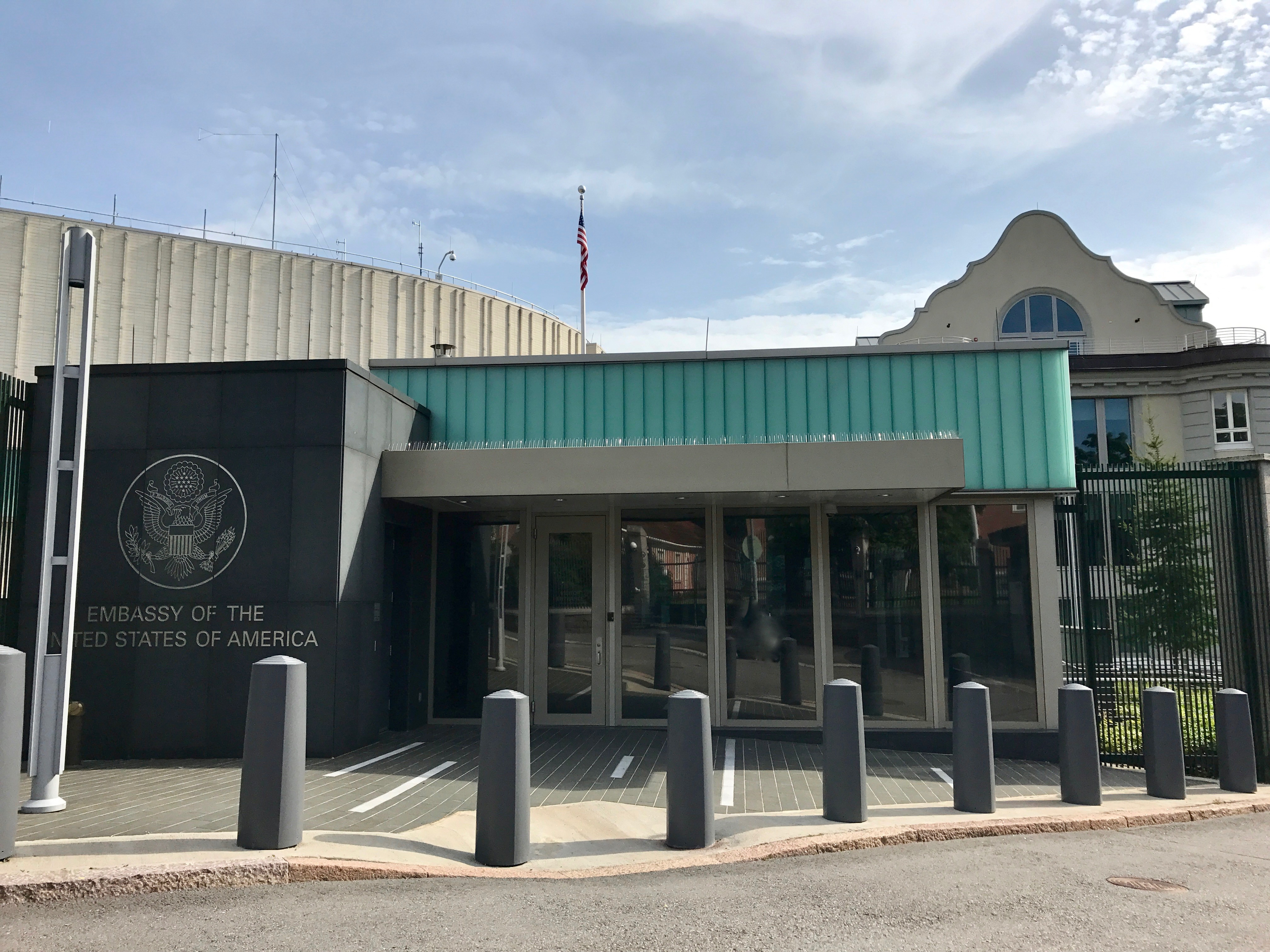
The Embassy of the United States

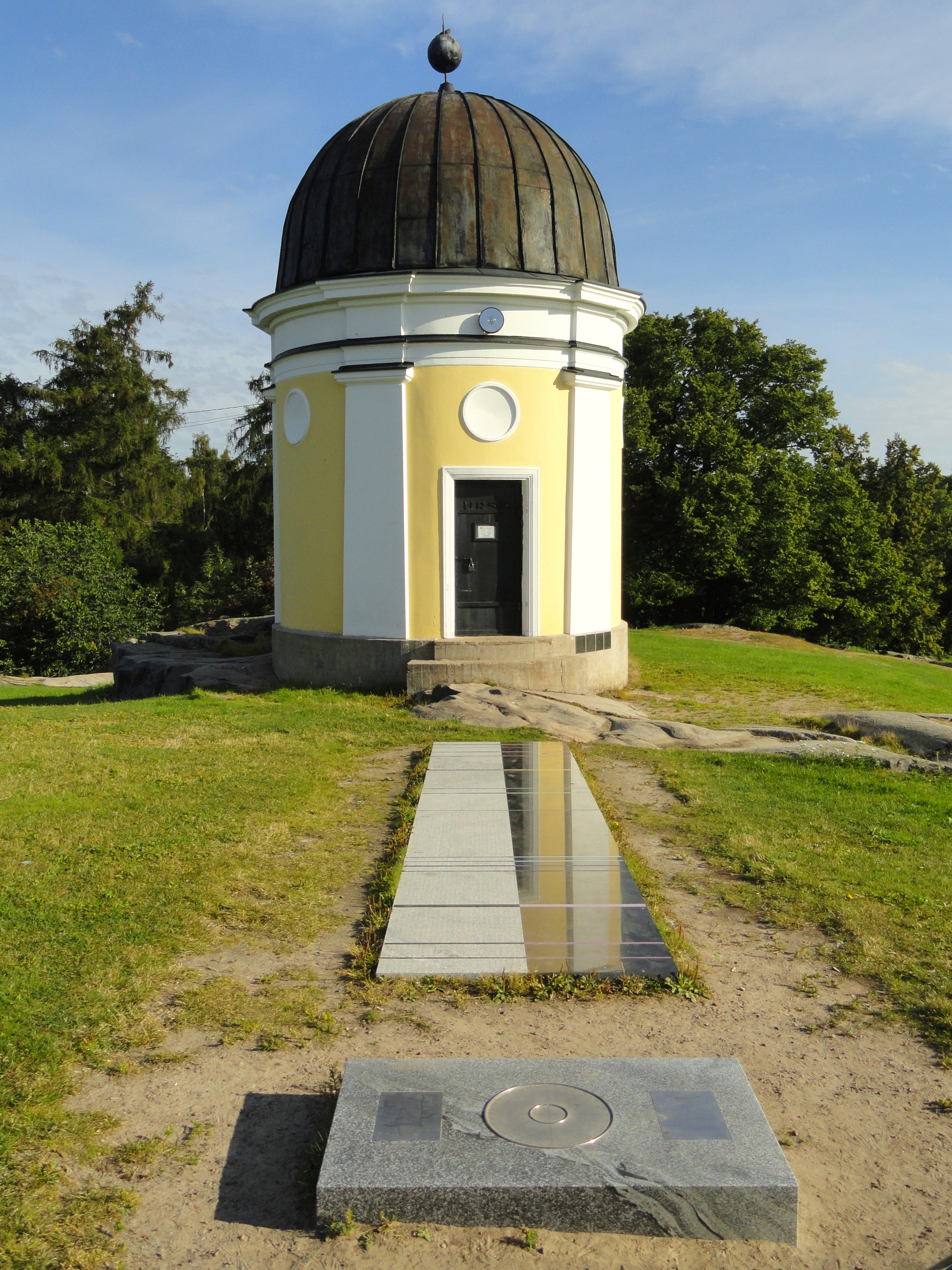
The Ursa Observatory

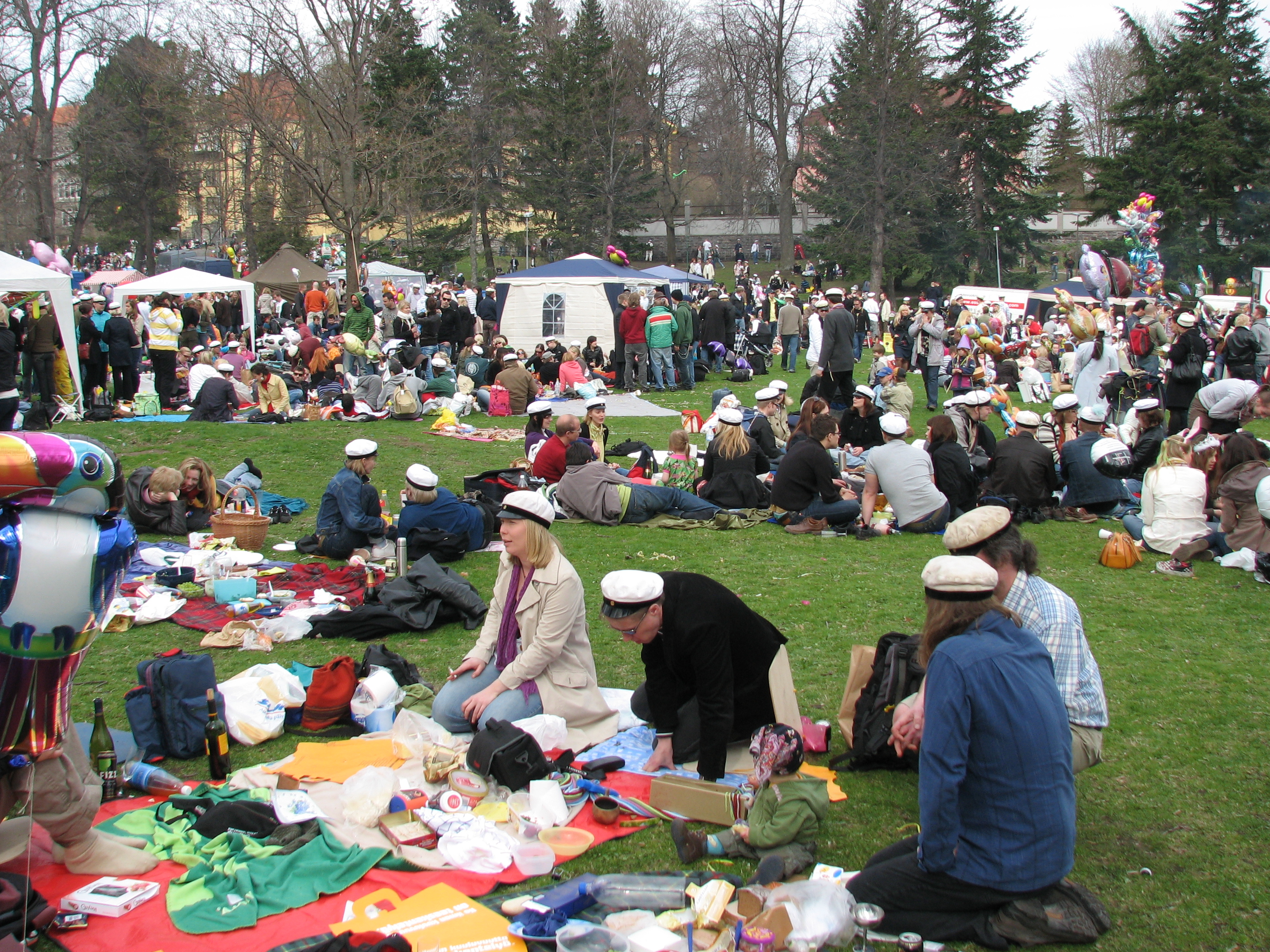
People having a Vappu picnic in Kaivopuisto.

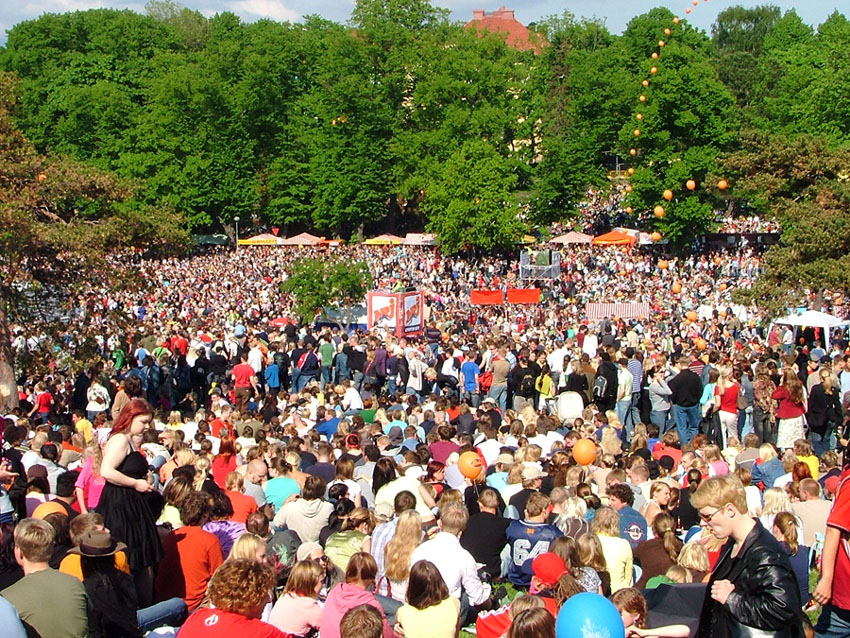
The Kaivopuisto park during a summer concert in 2005.

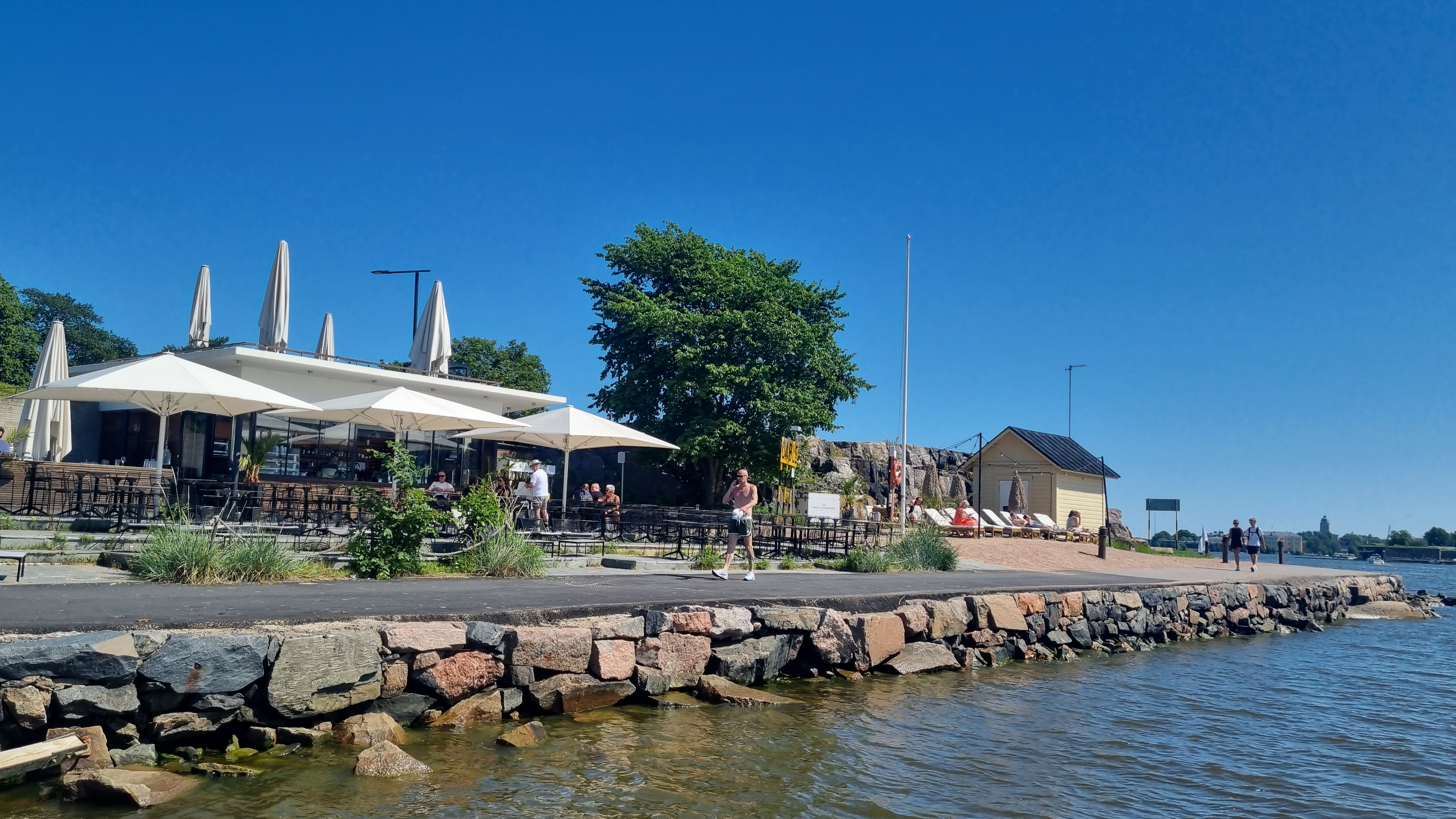
Mattolaituri.

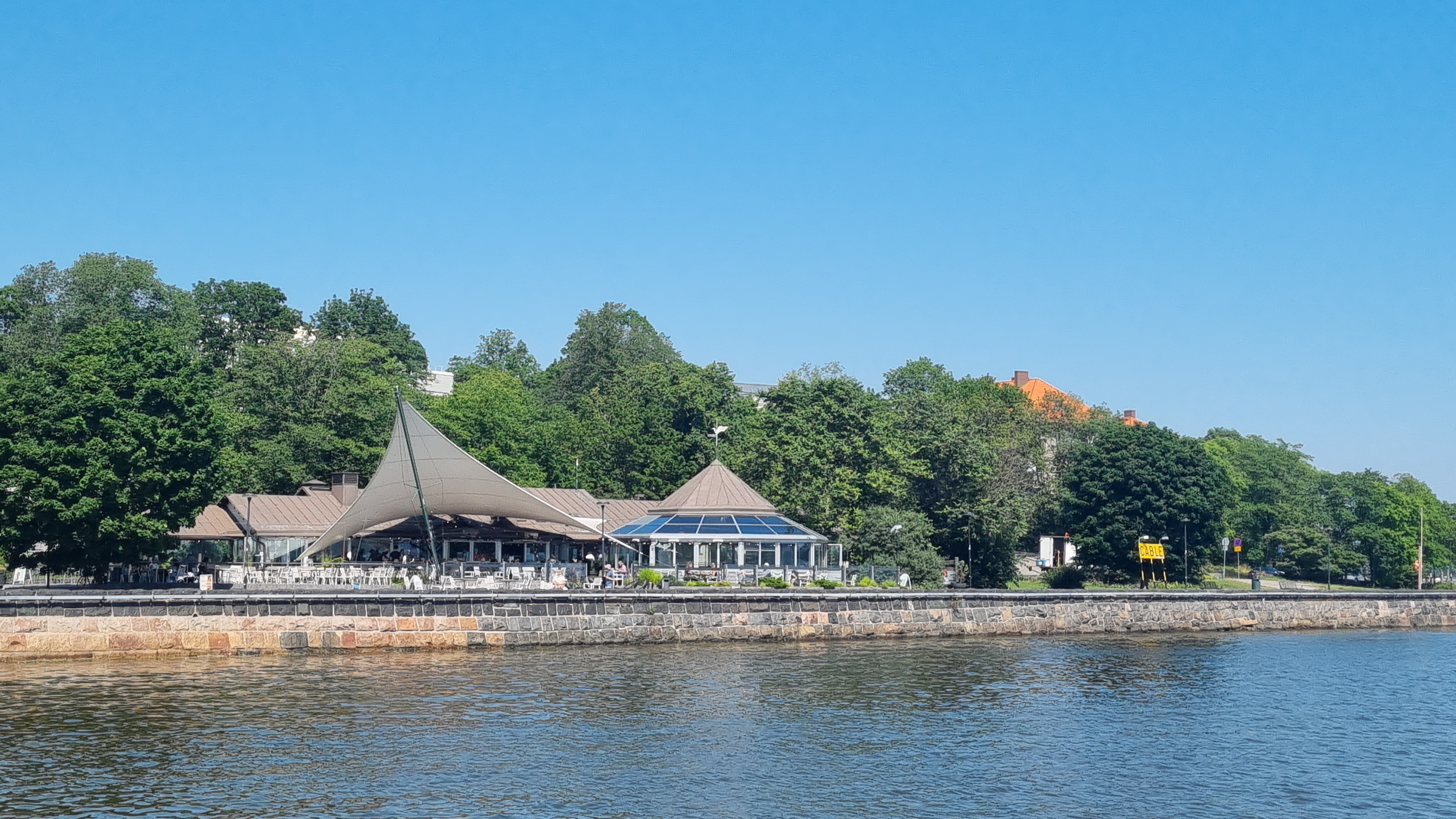
Café Ursula.

== See also ==
- Ullanlinna
- Mannerheim Museum
- Eira
