= OJA (disambiguation) =

OJA may refer to:

- Online Journalism Awards, administered by the Online News Association
- Thomas P. Stafford Airport, Oklahoma, USA (FAA LID code OJA)
- Optimal Jacobian Accumulation, an NP-complete problem related to automatic differentiation

== See also ==
- Oja (disambiguation)
