= Oea (Thera) =

Ancient town on the island of Thera

Coordinates: 36°22′36″N 25°28′48″E

Oea or Oia (Ancient Greek: Οἴα) was an ancient town on the island of Thera, mentioned by Ptolemy.

Its site is located near Kamari, and some of its ruins are submarine.
