= Tähdet ja avaruus =

- Editor: Marko Pekkola
- Categories: Science
- Frequency: Eight issues per year
- Circulation: 19 100
- Founded: 1971
- Company: Tähtitieteellinen yhdistys Ursa ry
- Country: Finland
- Based in: Helsinki
- Language: Finnish
- Website: Tähdet ja avaruus
- ISSN: 0355-9467

Tähdet ja avaruus (Finnish: Stars and space) is a Finnish science magazine which publishes recent developments, news and interviews in astronomy, space technology, cosmology and amateur astronomy. It is the largest circulation astronomy magazine in northern Europe.

Tähdet ja avaruus is a member magazine of the Ursa Astronomical Association and it can also be subscribed without a membership. Ursa Astronomical Association is a non profit organization which promotes astronomy and related sciences and astronomy school education.

The editor in chief of the magazine is Marko Pekkola, editor is Laura Koponen, staff science writers are Elina Nieppola and Sakari Nummila. Layout is by Heikki Laurila. A group of free science journalists assist the magazine. Many Finnish astronomers answer the readers questions in the questions and answers column.
