= Öja (Finland) =

Island in Finland

Coordinates: 63°49′N 22°54′E

Coat of arms of the former municipality

Öja is an island in the Gulf of Bothnia in Kokkola (Karleby) municipality, Finland. It has an area of 90 square kilometres (35 sq mi). Öja is also the name of a settlement on the island with a population of 800.

Öja was an independent Finnish municipality until 1969, when it became part of Kaarlela. Kaarlela became part of Kokkola in 1977.
