= Oya Tuzcuoğlu =

Turkish diplomat

Turkey Ambassador to Hungary
- In office 14 April 2008 – 1 July 2010
- President: Abdullah Gül
- Preceded by: Umur Apaydın
- Succeeded by: Hasan Kemal Gür

Turkey Ambassador to Qatar
- In office 1 June 2002 – 30 November 2004
- President: Ahmet Necdet Sezer
- Preceded by: Uğur Ergun
- Succeeded by: Mustafa Naci Sarıbaş

Personal details
- Born: 1948 (age 77–78) Eskişehir, Turkey
- Education: Political science
- Alma mater: Faculty of Political Science, Ankara University
- Profession: Diplomat

Oya Tuzcuoğlu (born 1948) is a Turkish retired diplomat and former ambassador of Turkey.

She served as Ambassador and Permanent Representative of Turkey to the International Civil Aviation Organization between 1 August 1999 and 31 May 2002; and further, as Ambassador of Turkey to Qatar between 1 June 2002 and 30 November 2004. Returned home, she was appointed in 2004 as the first female Director General of Protocol in the Ministry. On 14 April 2008, Tuzcuoğlu took office in Budapest as Ambassador of Turkey to Hungary. She served there until 1 July 2010. Her next appointment was once again to the International Civil Aviation Organization (ICAO) in Montreal, Canada, where she served as Ambassador and Permanent Representative of Turkey until 31 August 2012.

Oya Tuzcuoğlu retired in 2013.
