= 5080 Oja =

Florian asteroid

Discovery
- Discovered by: C.-I. Lagerkvist
- Discovery site: Kvistaberg Stn.
- Discovery date: 2 March 1976

Designations
- Named after: Tarmo Oja (Estonian–Swedish astronomer)
- Alternative designations: 1976 EB · 1951 WO; 1951 XA · 1988 XH; A924 SB
- Minor planet category: main-belt · (inner); Flora · Matterania

Orbital characteristics
- Epoch 23 March 2018 (JD 2458200.5)
- Uncertainty parameter 0
- Observation arc: 92.68 yr (33,852 d)
- Aphelion: 2.5215 AU
- Perihelion: 1.9617 AU
- Semi-major axis: 2.2416 AU
- Eccentricity: 0.1249
- Orbital period (sidereal): 3.36 yr (1,226 d)
- Mean anomaly: 255.46°
- Mean motion: 0° 17^{m} 37.32^{s} / day
- Inclination: 5.4503°
- Longitude of ascending node: 344.79°
- Argument of perihelion: 89.320°

Physical characteristics
- Mean diameter: 6.94±1.26 km 7.766±0.080 km 8.377 km 8.38 km (taken); 8.399±0.049 km
- Synodic rotation period: 7.2220±0.0004 h 7.2222±0.00003 h (Note: Pravec (2006) web: rotation period 7.2222±0.00003 hours and a brightness amplitude of 0.39±0.01 mag in the R-band. Observation period from 31 December 2005 to 10 January 2006. Quality Code is 3. Summary figures at the LCDB and Pravec, P.; Wolf, M.; Sarounova, L. (2016) with data sheet); 7.7 h
- Geometric albedo: 0.1573; 0.1741±0.0430; 0.218±0.021; 0.31±0.15
- Spectral type: S · S (assumed)
- Absolute magnitude (H): 12.52±0.04 (R) · 12.6; 12.9 · 12.97 · 13.01; 13.01±0.064; 13.15±0.12

5080 Oja, provisional designation 1976 EB, is a stony Florian asteroid from the inner regions of the asteroid belt, approximately 8 kilometers in diameter. It was discovered on 2 March 1976, by astronomer Claes-Ingvar Lagerkvist at the Kvistaberg Station of the Uppsala Observatory in Sweden. In 1992, it was named after Estonian–Swedish astronomer Tarmo Oja. The S-type asteroid has a rotation period of 7.222 hours.

== Orbit and classification ==
Oja is a member of the Flora family (402), a giant asteroid family and the largest family of stony asteroids in the main belt. It orbits the Sun in the inner main belt at a distance of 2.0–2.5 AU once every 3 years and 4 months (1,226 days; semi-major axis of 2.24 AU). Its orbit has an eccentricity of 0.12 and an inclination of 5° with respect to the ecliptic.

On 29 September 1924, the asteroid was first observed as A924 SB at Heidelberg Observatory, where the body's observation arc begins two days later on 1 October 1924.

== Physical characteristics ==
Oja has been characterized as a common, stony S-type asteroid by Pan-STARRS's photometric survey, in line with the overall spectral type of the Flora family.

=== Rotation period ===
In January 2006, a rotational lightcurve of Oja was obtained from photometric observations by an international collaboration of astronomers including Petr Pravec at Ondřejov Observatory and Donald Pray at Carbuncle Hill Observatory (912). The consolidated lightcurve analysis gave a rotation period of 7.222 hours and a brightness variation between 0.31 and 0.39 magnitude (U=3/3). The result supersedes a period of 7.7 hours obtained by the discoverer (Claes-Ingvar Lagerkvist) in March 1976 (U=2).

=== Diameter and albedo ===
According to the survey carried out by the NEOWISE mission of NASA's Wide-field Infrared Survey Explorer, Oja measures between 6.94 and 8.399 kilometers in diameter and its surface has an albedo between 0.1573 and 0.31. The Collaborative Asteroid Lightcurve Link adopts an albedo of 0.1573 from Pravec's revised WISE data and uses a diameter of 8.38 kilometers based on an absolute magnitude of 13.01.

== Naming ==
This minor planet was named after the Swedish astronomer of Estonian descent Tarmo Oja (born 1934), who was a professor in astronomy at Uppsala University and the director of the discovering Kvistaberg Station during 1970–1999. His research included the structure of galaxies and variable stars. The official naming citation was published by the Minor Planet Center on 14 July 1992 (M.P.C. 20522).
