= Ojala (surname) =

Family name

Ojala is a Finnish and Estonian surname. Notable people with the surname include:

- Antero Ojala (1916–1988), Finnish speed skater
- Arvo Ojala (1920–2005), American Hollywood technical adviser
- Janne Ojala (born 1977), Finnish tennis player
- Juhani Ojala (born 1989), Finnish professional footballer
- Kirt Ojala (born 1968), American major league baseball player
- Mika Ojala (born 1988), Finnish professional footballer
- William R. Ojala (1925–2018), American politician and lawyer
