= Mannerheim (disambiguation) =

Carl Gustaf Emil Mannerheim (1867–1951) was a Finnish military leader and statesman.

Mannerheim may also refer to:

== Surname ==
- Mannerheim (family), a noble family
  - Johan Augustin Mannerheim (1706–1778), Swedish artillery colonel and commandant
  - Carl Erik Mannerheim (1759–1837), Finnish vice chairman and statesman
  - Carl Gustaf Mannerheim (naturalist) (1797–1854), Finnish entomologist
  - Carl Robert Mannerheim (1835–1914), Finnish aristocrat and businessman
  - Helene Mannerheim, née von Julin (1842–1881), Finnish noblewoman
  - Sophie Mannerheim (1863–1928), Finnish nurse
  - Carl Erik Johan Mannerheim (1865–1915), Finnish banker
- Jenny Mannerheim (born 1977), Swedish art director

== Other uses ==
- Mannerheim (film), a cancelled film
- Mannerheim Cross, a Finnish military decoration
- Mannerheim League for Child Welfare, a Finnish non-governmental organization
- Mannerheim Line, a defensive line during the Winter War
- Mannerheim Museum, a museum in Helsinki, Finland
- Mannerheim Park
  - Mannerheim Park, Seinäjoki, a park in Seinäjoki, Finland
  - Mannerheim Park, Oulu, a park in Oulu, Finland
- Mannerheimintie ("Mannerheim Road"), a boulevard and main street in Helsinki, Finland
