= Carl Mannerheim =

Carl Mannerheim may refer to:

- Carl Erik Mannerheim (1759–1837), Finnish and Swedish soldier, statesman and member of the Senate of Finland
- Carl Gustaf Mannerheim (naturalist) (1797–1854), Finnish nobleman, amateur entomologist and governor of the Viipuri province
- Carl Robert Mannerheim (1835–1914), Finnish aristocrat and businessman
- Carl Mannerheim (banker) (1865–1915), Finnish and Swedish nobleman, banker and member of the Diet of Finland
- Carl Gustaf Emil Mannerheim (1867–1951), Finnish military commander and statesman

== See also ==
- Carl Gustaf Mannerheim (disambiguation)
- Mannerheim (disambiguation)
- Karl Mannheim, Hungarian sociologist
