= Julin (surname) =

Julin is a Nordic surname. Notable people with the surname include:

- Åke Julin (1919–2008), Swedish water polo player
- Albert von Julin (1846–1906), Finnish businessman and vuorineuvos
- Albert Lindsay von Julin (1871–1944), Finnish engineer, businessman and vuorineuvos, nephew of Albert
- Cecilia Julin (born 1955), Swedish diplomat
- Erik Julin (1796–1874), Finnish apothecary, shipowner and industrialist, uncle of Albert
- Erik Julin (botanist) (1906–1990), Swedish botanist
- Harald Julin (1890–1967), Swedish swimmer and water polo player, father of Åke and Rolf
- Helene von Julin (1842–1881), Finnish noblewoman, daughter of John von Julin and mother of Carl Gustaf Emil Mannerheim
- Jessica Julin (born 1978), Finnish football player
- John von Julin (1787–1853), Finnish pharmacist, factory owner and vuorineuvos, father of Albert and brother of Erik
- Magda Julin (1894–1990), Swedish figure skater
- Pia Julin (born 1969), Finnish Olympic shooter
- Rolf Julin (1918–1997), Swedish water polo player, son of Harald and brother of Åke
- Urho Julin (1928–2002), Finnish Olympic runner
