= Carl Gustaf Mannerheim =

Carl Gustaf Mannerheim may refer to:

- Carl Gustaf Mannerheim (naturalist) (1797–1854), Finnish entomologist and governor
- Carl Gustaf Emil Mannerheim (1867–1951), soldier, statesman, and President of Finland; grandson of the entomologist

== See also ==
- Carl Mannerheim (disambiguation)
- Mannerheim (disambiguation)
