= Carl Mannerheim (banker) =

Finnish count and banker (1865–1915)

Count Carl Mannerheim
- Count Carl Mannerheim (left) and his brother Gustaf (right) in 1885
- Born: Carl Erik Johan Mannerheim; 18 March 1865; Askainen, Grand Duchy of Finland
- Died: 6 July 1915 (aged 50); Stockholm, Sweden
- Family: Mannerheim

Count Carl Erik Johan Mannerheim (18 March 1865 – 6 July 1915) was a Swedish-Finnish nobleman, bank director, and member of the Diet of Finland who later resided in Sweden. He served as the head of the Finnish noble family of Mannerheim; within this family, the title of count was inherited exclusively by the eldest son, while his brothers held the lower rank of baron (vapaaherra).

Carl Mannerheim's parents were Count Carl Robert Mannerheim—owner of the Louhisaari Manor—and Hedvig Charlotta Hélène von Julin. His siblings included the nurse Sophie Mannerheim, the marshal and president Carl Gustaf Emil Mannerheim, the author Eva Mannerheim-Sparre, and the businessman Johan Mannerheim. He was married to the singer Aina Johanna Ehrnrooth. Their son, Carl-Erik Mannerheim, later became an estate owner in both Finland and Sweden, while their daughter, Aina Hélène Louise, was married to the businessman Carl Johan Ehrnrooth. The politician Georg C. Ehrnrooth was a grandson of Mannerheim (through his daughter).

Mannerheim graduated from the Helsingfors privatlyceum in 1882, completed a law degree in 1887, and received the title of varatuomari (a legal qualification roughly equivalent to a junior judge or qualified lawyer) in 1890. He worked briefly as an official in the Senate of Finland and ran his own law practice, before moving in 1895 to the Helsinki branch of the Pohjoismaiden Osakepankki (Nordic Joint-Stock Bank) to serve as its second manager, becoming its manager in 1898. Mannerheim participated in the Diet as a member of the Estate of the Nobility in 1891, 1894, 1897, and 1899. At the 1897 Diet, he represented the comital (countly) branch of the Mannerheim family (his father being unable to attend) while on the other occasions, he represented the baronial branch of the family by proxy.

During the first period of oppression, Mannerheim was a prominent constitutionalist and a member of the board of the Kagal—the secret central organization for passive resistance movement. In April 1903, the governor-general of Finland, Nikolai Bobrikov, exiled him from the country, prompting his move to Sweden. Although the exile order was rescinded as early as January 1905, Mannerheim remained in Sweden and acquired Swedish citizenship in 1908. During this period, he also traveled to America and was involved in establishing a center for the Finnish resistance movement in New York. From 1904 to 1910, he served as a director at the Swedish bank Stockholm-Öfre Norrland. Furthermore, beginning in 1908, he served on the board of the life insurance company Thule, and from 1910, he held the position of chairman of the boards for the companies Kramfors and Frånö Nya.
