= Albert von Julin =

Finnish businessman (1846–1906)

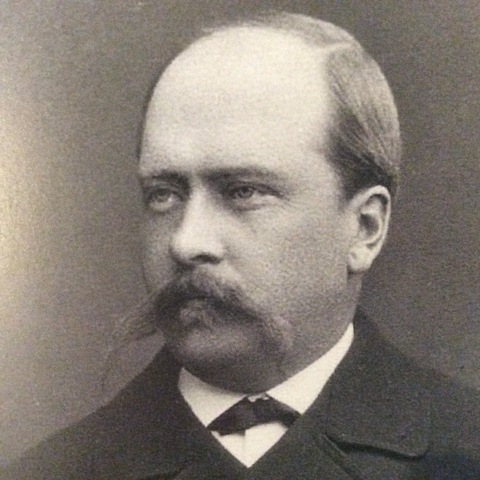
- Born: Johan Albert Edvard von Julin; 22 December 1846; Pohja, Finland
- Died: 7 June 1906 (aged 59); Pohja, Finland

Johan Albert Edvard von Julin (December 22, 1846 – June 7, 1906) was a Finnish businessman and vuorineuvos, who was the CEO of Fiskars Ab from 1875, rescuing the company from financial difficulties. He was the uncle of Gustaf Mannerheim, who was later known as the Marshal of Finland and the Commander-in-chief of the Finnish Defence Forces.

== Biography ==
Albert von Julin, who was born on December 22, 1846, in the municipality of Pohja, was the youngest son of John von Julin (1787–1853), one of the most important industrial leaders of the 19th century. The father died when Albert was six years old. After attending the Helsingfors Lyceum, Albert was sent to the Filipstad apprentice in Bergslagen, Sweden, which was by nature a school of supervisors where civil servants were trained; Similar teaching did not begin to appear in Finland until the 20th century, so Albert von Julin received a rare early practical training in the core competencies of his company in Finland, and most obviously the training was very useful, especially as von Julin's company grew.

Albert von Julin's independent business began immediately after the end of the guardianship in 1866. After the death of his father, his older brother Emil von Julin (1835–1898) inherited half of the company, the Fiskars rolling mill, the Antskog and Kärkelä ironworks, the Orijärvi mine and the 32,000-yard mine. Albert von Julin, for his part, inherited the Koski and Kärkölä blast furnaces and the considerable land assets associated with them. Von Julin, who succeeded in his own business, leased the Fiskars rolling mill from his brother, who was in financial difficulties, in 1875. Emil von Julin's business soon came under the control of the trusteeship, and in the spring of 1875 Albert von Julin became the "executive administrator". He was to serve in the position only until the company's assets could be sold. The administration did not go smoothly, as there was talk of bankrupting the company in 1878. Among other things, Fiskars' assets were not traded, so the formation of a limited company in 1883 remained a compulsory solution.

Albert von Julin first sought to get rid of various risk factors as a company administrator and then as a limited company property manager. Under his leadership, the company was quite reticent about the huge, but at the same time risky market in Russia, especially due to exchange rate fluctuations. The company developed its own brand, which in addition to wrought iron and castings included fine guarantees and agricultural tools. Albert von Julin was a self-appointed factory manager thanks to both his previous evidence and his more than 20 percent stake. From the mid-1880s, the board of Fiskars Ab was entirely run by von Julin.

Albert von Julin sat as many as eleven times as a representative of the nobility in the Finnish parliament, most commonly as a representative of the Bergenheim clan on his wife Sofia's side. His work in parliament was not particularly active, as during his nearly three-decade parliamentary career, von Julin made four speeches, most commonly expressions of support for other representatives. In addition, he was involved in two petitions with other representatives. Von Julin sat on the Finnish-Russian committee dealing with customs issues in the railway industry. The patron who held the title of mountain councilor from 1897 was also an active municipal politician with positions of trust in the Perniö municipal government. In addition, he was involved in the preparations for the railway known as the seafront between Helsinki and Turku.

Albert von Julin died a couple of years after becoming ill on June 7, 1906, in his home municipality of Pohja. His nephew Albert Lindsay von Julin (1871–1944) was appointed CEO of Fiskars Ab. Koski's blast furnace was led by an elder son, engineer Albert von Julin (1876–1918). The younger son, Deputy Judge Rolf Jacob von Julin (1881–1942), was the CEO of Kaukaan Tehdas Oy in the forest industry.

Albert von Julin had also acted as guardian of his nephew Gustaf Mannerheim, Marshal of Finland, after the death of von Julin's sister Helene Mannerheim, Gustaf's mother.

== Aftermath ==
Albert von Julin was described as having an interest in entrepreneurship. He was a supervisor and a patron who was involved in agriculture and the management of health care and schooling for his subordinates.

== See also ==
- Mannerheim Family

== Bibliography ==
- Karonen, Petri (2004). Patruunat ja poliitikot: yritysjohtajat taloudellisina ja poliittisina toimijoina Suomessa 1600–1920 (in Finnish). Helsinki: Finnish Literature Society. ISBN 9517465890.
- Klemelä, Kirsi (1999). Ammattikunnista ammatillisiin oppilaitoksiin: ammatillisen koulutuksen muotoutuminen Suomessa 1800-luvulta 1990-luvulle (in Finnish). Turku: University of Turku. ISBN 9512914344.
- Kuusterä, Antti (1989). Valtion sijoitustoiminta pääomamarkkinoiden murroksessa 1859–1913 (in Finnish). Helsinki: Suomen Historiallinen Seura. ISBN 9518915180.
- Laine, Eevert (1948). Suomen vuoritoimi 1809–1884 II: ruukit (in Finnish). Helsinki: Suomen Historiallinen Seura.
- Maanpää, J. (1942). Suomalaisia suurliikemiehiä (in Finnish). Helsinki: Otava.
- Nikander, Gabriel (1929). Fiskars bruks historia (in Swedish). Turku: Fiskars aktiebolag.
