= Hedvig Sohlberg =

Finnish politician, educator, temperance reformer (1858–1937)

- (undated)

MP

Member of Parliament for Uusimaa Province
- In office 1908–1913

Personal details
- Born: 29 January 1858 Pohja, Finland
- Died: 6 October 1937 (aged 79) Tammisaari, Finland
- Party: Swedish People's Party of Finland
- Occupation: educator; lecturer; social reformer; politician; textbook author

Hedvig Sohlberg (January 29, 1858 - October 6, 1937) was a Finnish principal of a woman's normal school, lecturer, and prominent advocate of prohibition. She was an MP of the Swedish People's Party of Finland, having been a member from 1908 to 1914, representing the constituency of the Uusimaa Province. She was also a member of the Ekenas City Council and was the vice-chair of the central government of the Nykterhetsförbundet Hälsa och Trafik (Swedish Sobriety Federation of Finland).

== Early life and education ==
Hedvig Sohlberg was born at Pohja, on 29 January 1858. Her parents were the vicar Fredrik Sohlberg and Maria Rosina Richter. Hedvig's siblings were Seth Sohlberg, Senior Ministerial Adviser, and Gerhard Sohlberg, architect.

She was educated at the Ekenas Seminary, in 1880. Later, she attended the University of Helsinki.

== Career ==
She worked as a teacher at the private Swedish Girls' School in Mikkeli in 1882–1883, as a primary school teacher in Pohja parish in 1883–1889, and as the director of the Ekenäs Seminary in 1889–1927.

Sohlberg joined the Rojo Total Abstinence Society and, after removing to Ekenas, was made chair of the Ekenas Temperance Society. In 1902, she became a member of the Finnish national temperance society known as “Raittiuden Ystiiwilt” (Friends of Sobriety). When the Swedish-Finnish Temperance Alliance was formed, in 1905, she was elected a member of the board and became vice-chair. She was also a member of the "White Ribbon Society", the Woman's Christian Temperance Union. She did valuable service in conducting Temperance Institutes for public school teachers and took part in various school and other temperance conventions in the Scandinavian countries, including the Finnish Swedish Temperance Association. In 1907, at the first evening public meeting of the Anti-Alcohol Congress in Stockholm, Sohlberg gave her experience as to the best methods of instruction.

Her loyalty to the temperance cause and her activity in promoting it led to her election for two terms (1908-13) to the Finnish Parliament, where she took an active part in drafting the Temperance Bill and in securing its enactment.

Sohlberg served as chair of the YMCA in Ekenäs.

She was also a textbook author.

== Death ==
Hedvig Sohlberg died in Tammisaari, on 6 October 1937.

== See also ==
- List of Finnish MPs
