= Helene Mannerheim =

Finnish countess (1842–1881)

Hélène Mannerheim
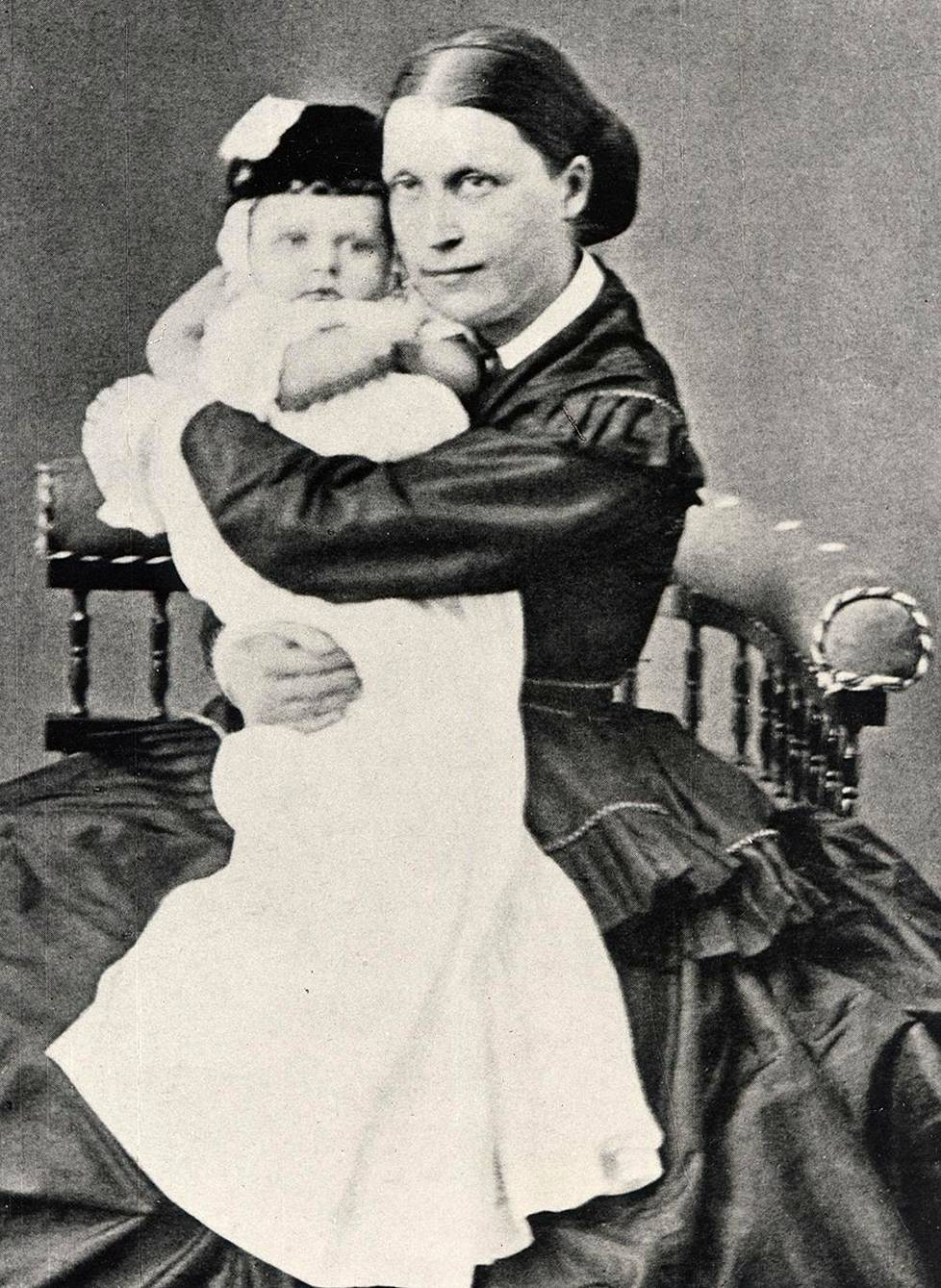
- Helene with a child
- Born: Hedvig Charlotta Hélène von Julin; 25 March 1842; Fiskars, Pohja, Grand Duchy of Finland
- Died: 23 January 1881 (aged 38); Sällvik, Pohja, Grand Duchy of Finland
- Spouse: Count Carl Robert Mannerheim
- Children: 7, including: Baroness Eva Charlotta Lovisa Sofia Mannerheim; Count Carl Erik Johan Mannerheim; Baron Carl Gustaf Emil Mannerheim; Countess Eva Mannerheim-Sparre
- Parent(s): John von Julin; Charlotta Johanna Ottiliana Jägerskiöld
- Family: Julin

Countess Hedvig Charlotta Hélène Mannerheim (née von Julin; 25 March 1842 – 23 January 1881) was a Finnish noblewoman, known as the first wife of Count Carl Robert Mannerheim. She was also the mother of Marshal Carl Gustaf Emil Mannerheim.

Hélène von Julin was born in March 1842 in Fiskars, the eldest daughter of the industrialist Johan Jakob von Julin and his third wife Charlotta Jägerskiöld. She was her father's seventh child, but the first daughter to live to adulthood. Her half-brother was Emil Lindsay von Julin (1835–1898), her sister Elisabet Johanna Emilia Lovén von Julin (1843–1941), her brother Johan Albert Edvard von Julin (1846–1906) and her half-sister Sigrid Lovisa Charlotta Björkenheim von Julin (1849–1924). The siblings included 11 children from four marriages, five of whom lived to adulthood.

In 1880, the husband went bankrupt after squandering his own inheritance and his wife's fortune on gambling and unsuccessful farming experiments, and fled to Paris with his mistress, leaving his wife alone with their children. Hélène died of a heart attack in Sällvik on 23 January 1881 at the age of 38, and her brother Albert became the children's guardian. The eldest daughter, 18-year-old Sophie, later took responsibility for the care of her younger siblings.

== Gallery ==
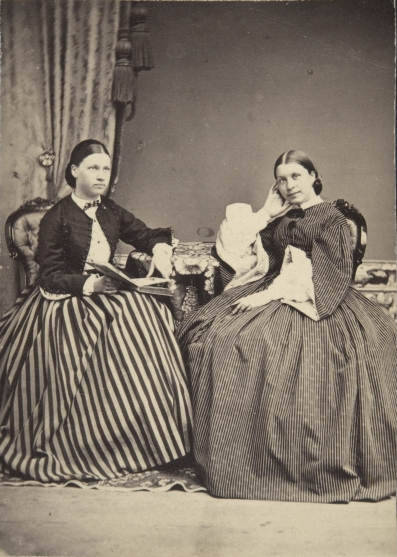
Young Helene von Julin with her sister Elizabeth

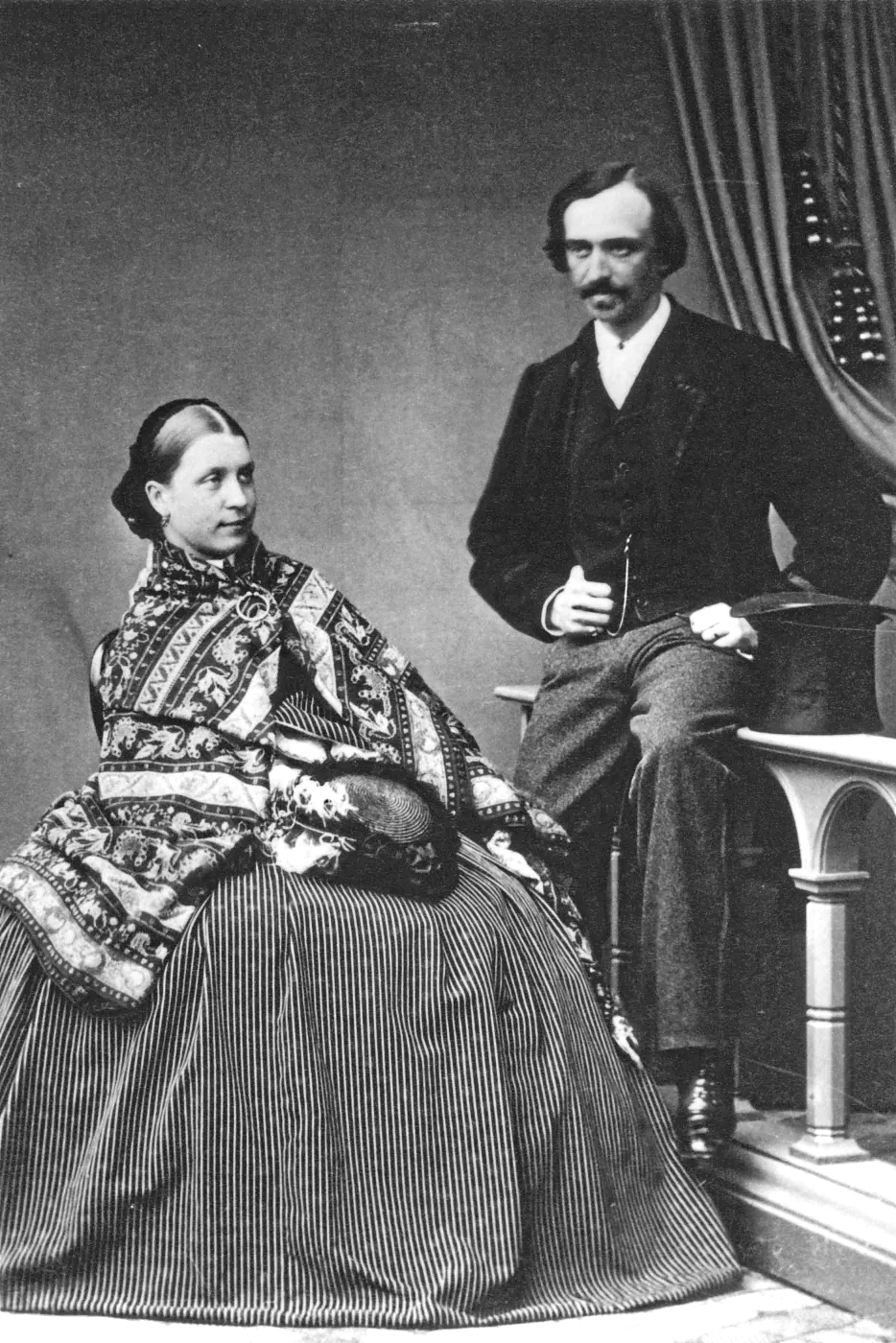
Countess Hélène Mannerheim with her husband Count Carl Robert Mannerheim

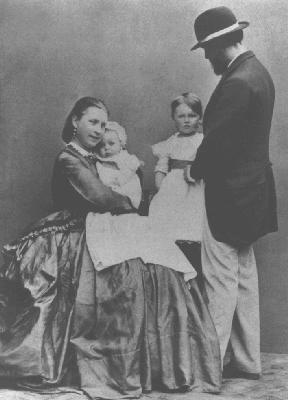
With Carl Robert and two of their children

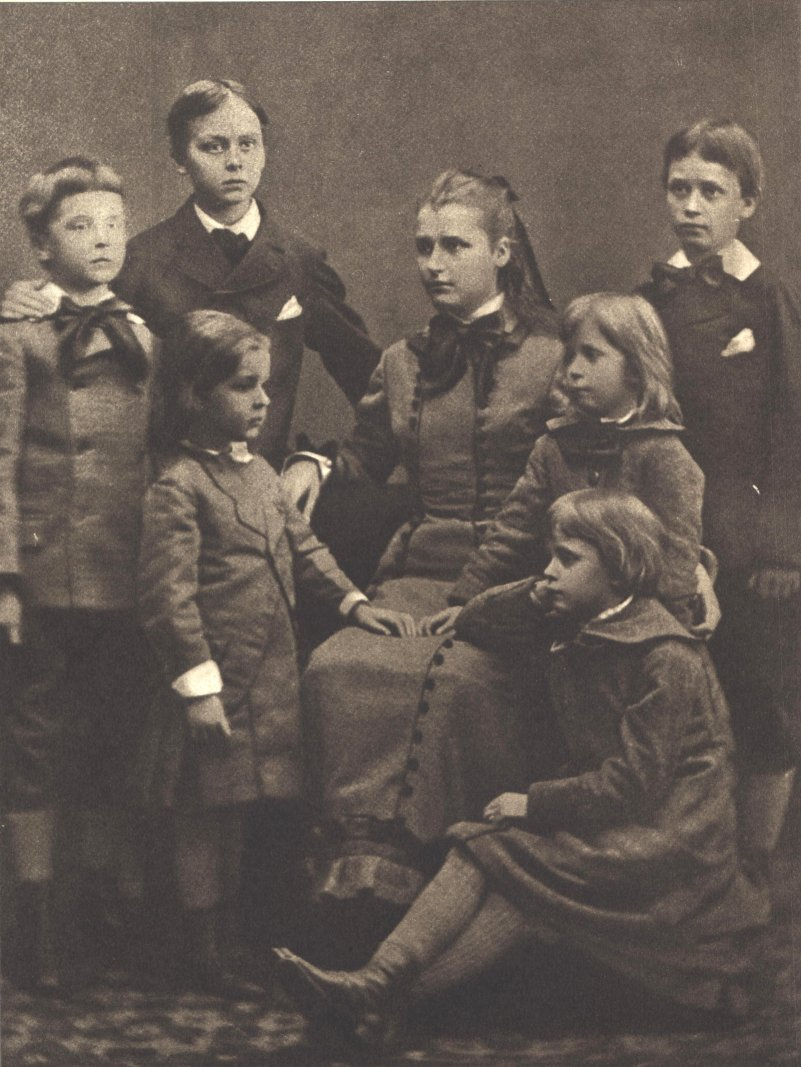
Their 7 children. Middle: Sophie Mannerheim; left: Carl, August and Johan; right: Annicka and Carl Gustaf Emil (i.e. Gustaf); sitting: Eva, c. 1880
