= Albert Lindsay von Julin =

Finnish engineer, businessman & vuorineuvos (1871–1944)

vuorineuvos Albert Ludvig Lindsay von Julin
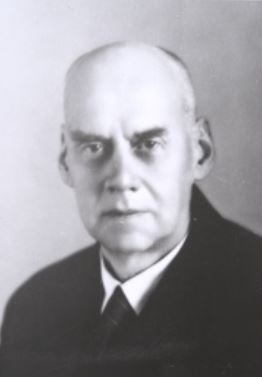
- Born: 2 August 1871; Pohja, Grand Duchy of Finland
- Died: 8 May 1944 (aged 72); Pohja, Finland
- Education: Finnish Polytechnical Institute; Royal Institute of Technology (Stockholm)
- Board member of: see → Board memberships
- Spouse: 1898 → Elin Constance née Blomberg
- Parent(s): Emil Lindsay von Julin and Hildur née Kistner
- Awards: vuorineuvos 1921; Cross of Liberty, 1st Class; Commander of the Order of the Lion of Finland; Commander of the White Rose of Finland, 2nd Class; Cross of Liberty, 2nd Class; Medal of Liberty; Commemorative Medal for Winter War; Civil Defence Medal of Merit, 2nd Class

Manager of Fiskars
- In office 1906–1942

Albert Ludvig Lindsay von Julin (2 August 1871 – 8 May 1944) was a Finnish engineer, businessman and vuorineuvos.

Julin was born in Pohja to an industrial family. After his studies he spent several years gaining work experience in Caucasus, after which he returned to Finland to manage his family business, the Fiskars company. Julin led the company for almost 40 years and grew it into one of the largest companies in Finland.

Julin also had a significant role in creating the Finnish employers' associations. He took part in the last Diet of Finland in 1904–1905 and in local politics in Pohja.

== Early life and studies ==
Julin was born in Fiskars, Pohja; his parents were Emil Lindsay von Julin, manager and co-owner of the local Fiskars ironworks, and Hildur, née Kistner. The Julin family was an influential Finnish industrialist family. He graduated in 1890 in private Finland-Swedish reallyceum in Hamina. Julin went to study in the Faculty of Chemistry in Finnish Polytechnical Institute and graduated as an engineer in 1894. He continued his studies in the Royal Institute of Technology in Stockholm, Sweden and graduated as a mining engineer in 1895. Subsequently, Julin travelled around Europe visiting a number of mining and engineering companies. He worked for Branobel in Baku, Caucasus in 1896–1900.

== Fiskars ==
Julin returned to Finland in 1900 and became an engineer at the Fiskars company. In 1904 he was appointed managing director and in 1906 he became the company general director after death of his paternal uncle, Albert von Julin. Julin invested on the premises and took over a number of companies, such as Billnäs Bruks, Tyko Bruks, Inha Bruks and Finska Bult. The subsidiaries continued operation as independent units. By 1920, Fiskars had regained its position as a significant company, being the tenth largest of the newly independent Finland and the second largest engineering company after the State Railways Engineering Works.

Julin managed Fiskars for almost 40 years, until 1942. As a manager he was an old-school industrialist who was against labourism; however, he was respected as a manager and negotiation partner by his employees. He was the last director of the company from the Julin family.

== Organisational activities ==
Julin was a founding member of the 1903-created Finnish Engineering Industry Employers' Association, and was one of the employers' leaders in the industrial actions which emerged in the early 20th century. In 1908 he took part in founding the Finnish Engineering Industry Bureau and later the Finnish Industry Bureau. Julin was involved in the creation of the Finnish Engineering Industry Association and in 1921 formed the Finnish Industry Federation; he was a long-term member in both organisations.

== Political career ==
Julin was a municipality council member in Pohja and supported the local folk college. He took part in the last Diet of Finland in 1905–1906 as a member of the nobility.

== Personal life ==
Julin was married to Elin Constance, née Blomberg. The couple had a son, Albert von Julin, who died at a young age during the Finnish Civil War in 1918 as a victim of red terror. They also had a daughter, Maggie.

Julin is characterised as a warm and social person who had a large circle of friends. His social character led to increased alcohol intake which gave him the nickname Punschen. By the time Julin's drinking started to affect his work as manager of Fiskars.

== Board memberships ==
- West Uusimaa Finland-Swedish folk college (1909–1918)
- Helsingin osakepankki (1917–)
- Salon Sähkö- ja Konetehdas (1917–)
- Finnish Engineering Industry Association (1919–)
- Finnish Industry Federation (1921–)
- Finnish Engineering Industry Employers' Federation (1929–)
- Ab Ferraria (1931–)
- Rauman Naulatehdas Oy (1931–)
- Oy Teräsköysi (1938–)
- Finnish Industry Purchasing Centre (1939–)
- Oy Stockmann Ab
- FÅA
- Fiskars Finland-Swedish folk school
