= Eva Mannerheim-Sparre =

Finnish artist and writer (1870–1957)

Countess Eva Mannerheim-Sparre
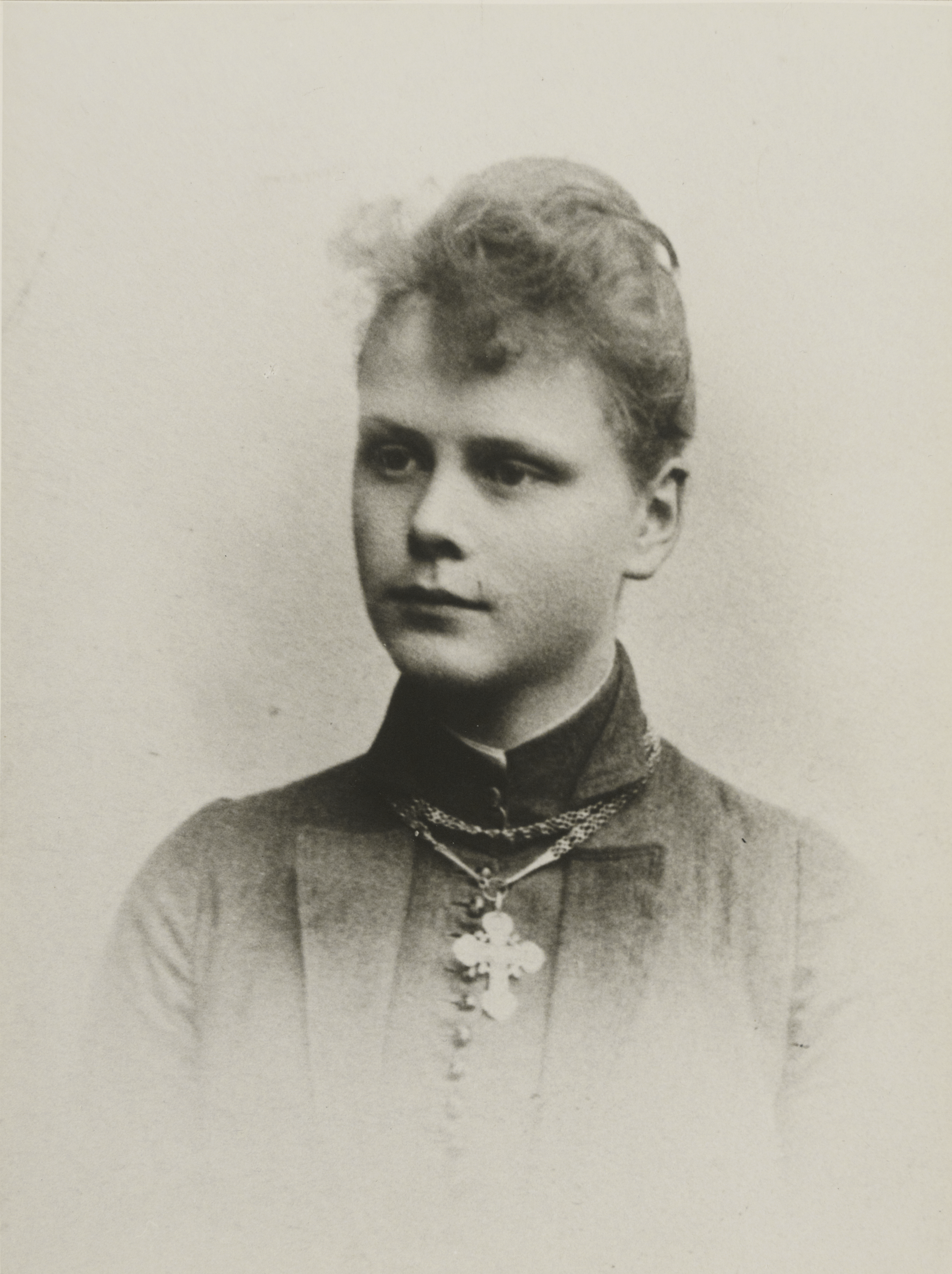
- Eva Mannerheim-Sparre, c. 1890s
- Born: Eva Hedvig Wilhelmina Johanna Mannerheim; 30 June 1870; Askainen, Grand Duchy of Finland
- Died: 27 December 1957 (aged 87); Stockholm, Sweden
- Occupations: Book artist; Writer
- Spouse: Pehr Louis Sparre af Söfdeborg (m. 1893)

Countess Eva Mannerheim-Sparre (1870–1957) was a Finnish book artist, designer and writer.

== Personal life ==
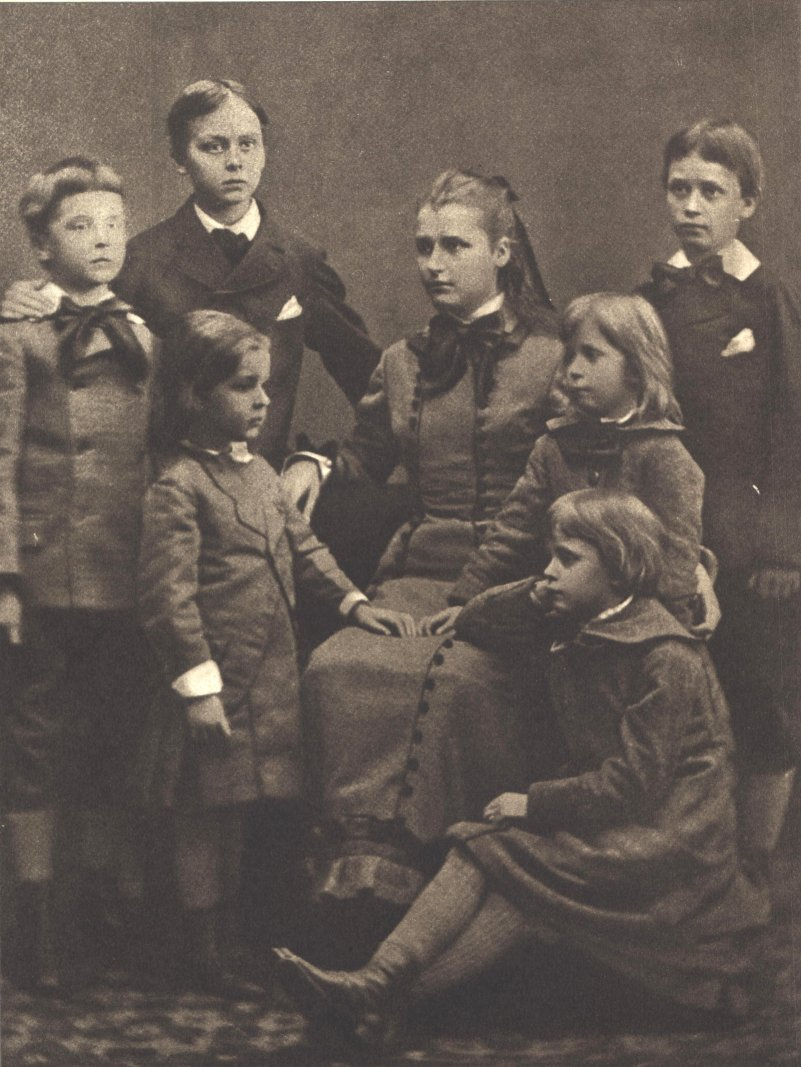
The Mannerheim siblings, c. 1880; Eva seen seated (front-right)

Eva Mannerheim was born to the comital branch of the noble Mannerheim family, as the fifth child (of seven) of Count Carl Robert Mannerheim and Hedvig Charlotta Hélène Mannerheim née von Julin, at the family's Louhisaari manor.

Her eldest sister was Sophie Mannerheim, a pioneer of modern nursing and child welfare in Finland. One of their brothers was Carl Gustaf Emil Mannerheim, who later became Marshal and the 6th President of Finland.

Eva's parents had separated by the time her mother died in 1881. She was sent to Stockholm for her schooling at the Tekniska skolan (Technical School) and later artistic and technical education, including drafting, woodblock printing and leatherwork. She returned to Finland in 1891, and began teaching leatherwork at the Ateneum art school.

In 1893, Eva Mannerheim married the artist and designer, Count Louis Sparre, with whom she had two sons. Louis was Swedish, but had moved to Finland prior to his marriage. Eva and Louis were involved with Iris, an art company in Porvoo, which was in business from 1897 to 1902. In 1908, the family moved to Sweden; this was on account of their children's education and the political situation in Finland, although some sources suggest that the motivation was Count Sparre's disappointment at not having received public honours in Finland.

== Career ==
=== Design ===
In the early part of her career Mannerheim-Sparre worked in the areas of technical drawing and design, including in collaboration with her husband, as Konstindustriell ritbyrå Eva & Louis Sparre ('Eva & Louise Sparre Industrial Arts Drafting Bureau'). She was also active in textile and furniture design, embroidery and related areas.

=== Book art ===
Her design and craft interests led Mannerheim-Sparre to book arts, and she is considered a pioneer of the modern book arts in Finland, and one of the leading figures of her time in the Nordic region. Her interests covered a broad range of matters including book design, bookbinding and typography. She remained active in bookbinding and design into the 1930s, when she had to give it up for health reasons following an accident.

She is also known to have planned to establish the provision of technical education in bookbinding, but her plans did not materialise.

=== Writing ===
Mannerheim-Sparre wrote several books in her life, mostly memoirs and travel journals, and especially towards the end of her career she was predominantly seen as a writer.

Her best-known book, however, is a cookery book titled Kokbok för finsmakare och vanliga hungriga (lit. 'Cookbook for Gourmands and the Ordinary Hungry') (Bonnier, Stockholm 1935; Finnish translation: Otava, Helsinki 1936), which has since been re-edited and printed several times.

==== Works ====
- Kokbok för finsmakare och vanliga hungriga (1935). The Finnish translation by Emerik Olsoni was published as Kreivitär Eva Mannerheim-Sparren keittokirja herkusuille ja tavallisille nälkäisille (1936).
- Bröllopsresan (1945). A description of a trip to Fjärrkarelen (Far Karelia) in the summer of 1893, illustrated by Louis Sparre.
- Villnäs, barndomshemmet (1945; 'Louhisaari, the Childhood Home').
- Konstnärsliv (1951; 'An Artist's Life'). Memoirs of the Sparre family up to 1908. The Finnish translation by Aili Paimen was published the same year.
- Barndomsminnen (1952; 'Childhood Memories'). The Finnish translation by Maijaliisa Auterinen was published the same year.
- Öken, sol och sand (1957; 'Desert, Sun and Sand'). A travel book about eastern Algeria and Morocco in 1921–22, with photographs by Louis Sparre. The Finnish translation by Kyllikki Villa was published the same year.
