= Fleming (noble family) =

Swedish noble family

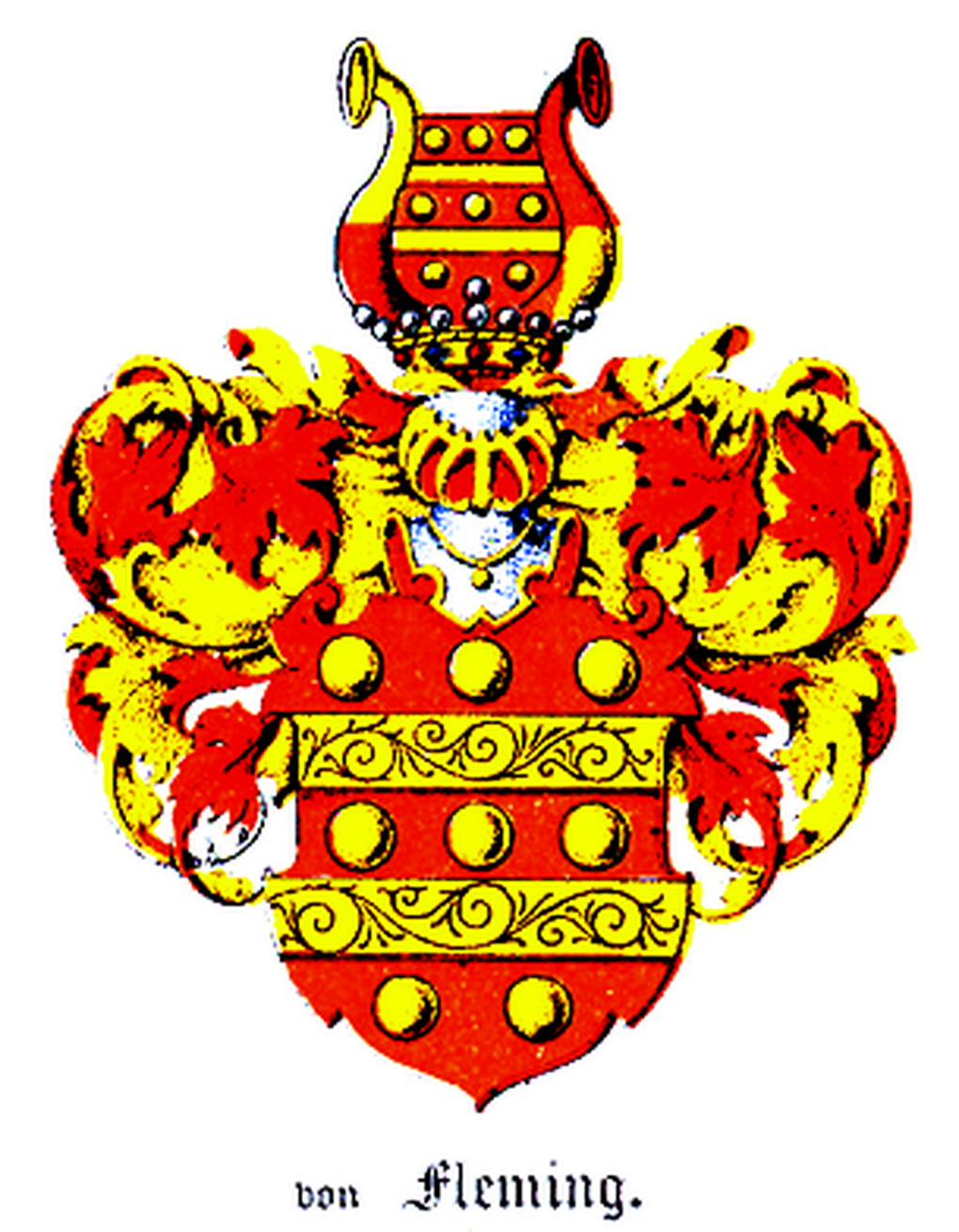
The untitled noble house of Flemings coat of arms

The Fleming family or Flemming is a Swedish noble family with a medieval frälse origin.

== History ==
Its first certainly known male ancestor, Knight Peder Klasson (Sir Peder Fleming), is documented as being alive in 1406. He came from Denmark to Sweden during the early reign of king Eric XIII of Sweden and is buried in the Riddarholm Church, Stockholm. He was probably son of a Claus Fleming who between 1331 and 1354 is mentioned as bailiff of Barth in the Pomeranian principality of Rügen (a Danish fief) and had in principle the same Coat of Arms. The name of the family denotes some of its origin to Flanders. When having first settled in the eastern part of Sweden (modern-day Finland), they soon became assimilated with the country, having married from among natives and grown into local societal activities. They inherited Louhisaari manor (in Swedish Villnäs) in Finland Proper (located in the modern-day municipality of Masku).

The family was one of the most prominent in Finland in the late Middle Ages and early modern period.

The then head of the house, sir Lars Fleming (died 1562), governor of the Stockholm Palace, was among the first ones to ever be created friherre in Sweden, which took place in the coronation of Eric XIV of Sweden on 29 June 1561. Baron Lars got the title Baron of Nynes (Nynäs) from one of his maternally inherited manors. His male line became extinct on 5 January 1569.

His cousin, sir Klaus Fleming (1535–1597), member of the Privy Council of Sweden, afterwards Lord High Admiral of Sweden, Lord High Constable of Sweden (marsk) and Governor General of Finland, was created on 2 August 1569 baron of the barony of Vik. His male line became extinct in the Åbo Bloodbath on 10 November 1599.

When the Swedish House of Knights was established, the family of Fleming of Louhisaari, noble since time immemorial, was registered there, under number 4 of untitled nobility.

Sir Klas or Claes Larsson Fleming (1592–1644), was an admiral and the first Governor of Stockholm (1634–1644) after the office was instituted by the Instrument of Government of 1634. (Note: The Over-Governor, or Överståthållaren of Stockholm was the highest official for the City between 1634 and 1967. The Office was instituted by the Instrument of Government of 1634.) His children were elevated to the friherre rank on 26 March 1651 by queen Christina of Sweden, with the title Baron of Liebelitz, due to service and accomplishments of the late father. This lineage continues to present day.

Sir Eric Fleming (1616–79), provincial governor, president, chamber councillor, afterwards Marshal of Nobility (lantmarskalken) was created Baron of Lais on 12 May 1654 by queen Christina of Sweden. His male line became extinct 29 July 1786.

Widow and children of Baron Claes Fleming af Liebelitz (1649–85), Marshal of Nobility, Lord High Treasurer of Sweden, president, a grandson of late sir Claes the admiral, were elevated on 10 December 1687 by king Charles XI of Sweden to the comital rank with the title Count to all male-line descendants. Their male line became extinct on 15 November 1729.

Baron Claes Adolf Fleming (1771–1831), councillor of state, Lord High Constable of Sweden was created count on 11 May 1818, but he did not leave any surviving male descendants.

Some members of the family still live in Sweden and the United States, but the line ended in the Finnish House of Nobility in mid-19th century.

== See also ==
- Swedish-speaking Finns
