= Carl Robert Mannerheim =

Finnish aristocrat and businessman (1835–1914)

Count Carl Robert Mannerheim
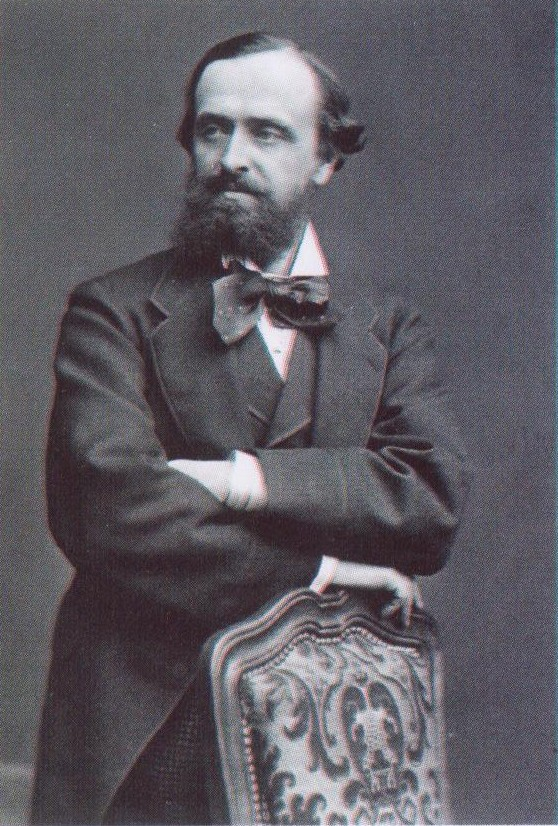
- Carl Robert Mannerheim, 1890s
- Born: 1 February 1835; Vyborg, Grand Duchy of Finland
- Died: 9 October 1914 (aged 79); Helsinki, Grand Duchy of Finland
- Spouse: Hedvig Charlotta Hélène von Julin
- Children: 7, including: Baroness Eva Charlotta Lovisa Sofia Mannerheim; Count Carl Erik Johan Mannerheim; Baron Carl Gustaf Emil Mannerheim; Countess Eva Mannerheim-Sparre
- Parent(s): Count Carl Gustaf Mannerheim; Eva Wilhelmina von Schantz
- Family: Mannerheim

Count Carl Robert Mannerheim (1 February 1835 – 9 October 1914) was a Finnish aristocrat and businessman. He was the son of naturalist Carl Gustaf Mannerheim, and father of Marshal Carl Gustaf Emil Mannerheim.

== Biography ==
Mannerheim wrote the satirical play Ditt och datt when he was a student at Helsinki, in 1858, which caused a political scandal ending in his dismissal from the university and the university rector's resignation.

Mannerheim owned Louhisaari Manor in Askainen, Turku and Pori Province, inherited from his father. He married Hedvig Charlotta Hélène von Julin (d. 1881, daughter of wealthy industrialist Johan Jacob von Julin), with whom he had seven children.

He was a founding member of the Kuusankoski paper mill, acting as the company's director from 1872 to 1878. He was forced to declare bankruptcy in 1879, and in 1880 the Louhisaari estate was transferred to his sister Mimmi (Eva Carolina). Mannerheim thereupon eloped to Paris with his mistress, baroness Sofia Nordenstam (d. 1914), where he had a bohemian lifestyle. Meanwhile, his seven children were in the custody of family members after the death of his wife in 1881. Mannerheim married Sofia Nordenstam in 1883, and the couple returned to Finland, where Mannerheim founded an office supplies company in Helsinki in 1887. Named Systema Oy Ab in 1909, the company later became Finland's main importer of typewriters.

Mannerheim was also active as a writer and translator, known for his radical liberal opinions. He became active as a resister of the Russification of Finland, and he tried to dissuade his son, who served in the Russian Imperial Army, from joining the Russo-Japanese War.

== Gallery ==
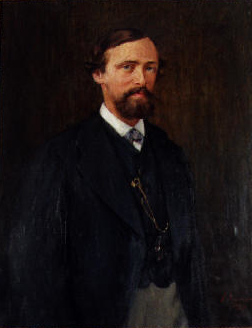
Portrait of young Mannerheim

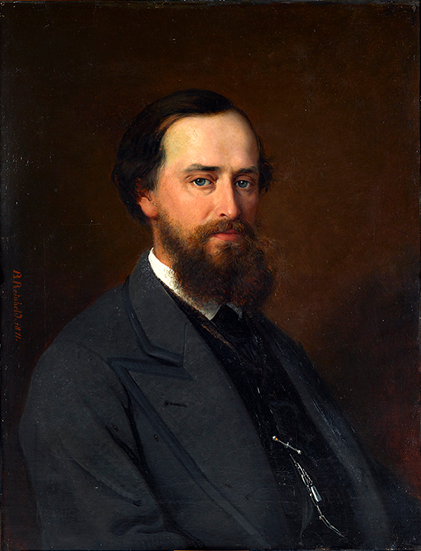
Portrait from 1871

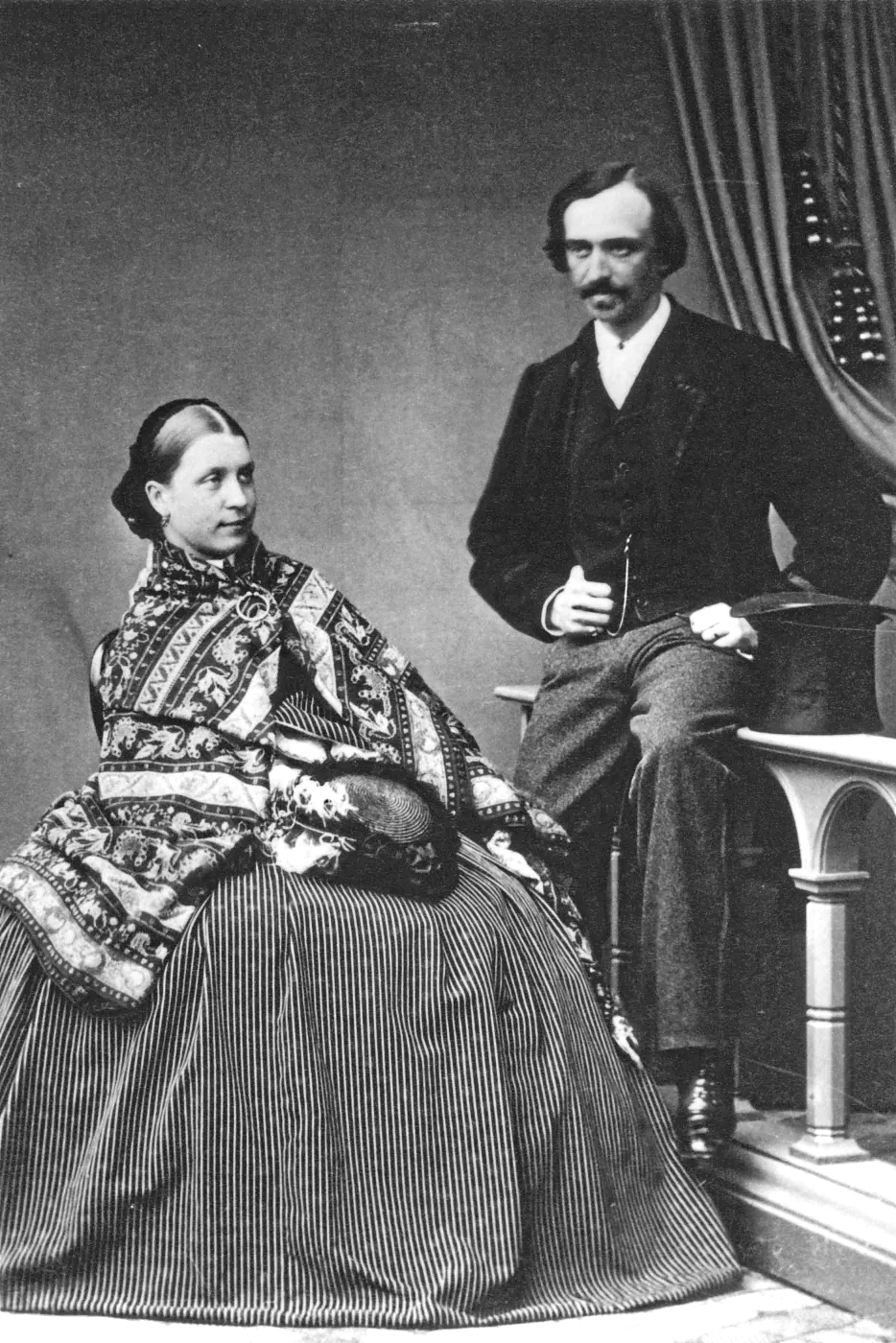
Count Mannerheim with his wife Countess Hélène Mannerheim

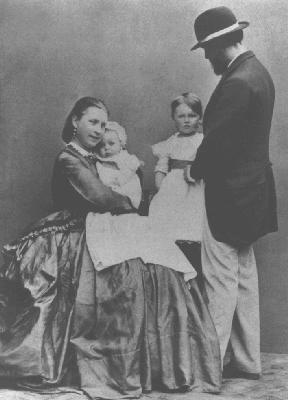
With Helene and two of their children

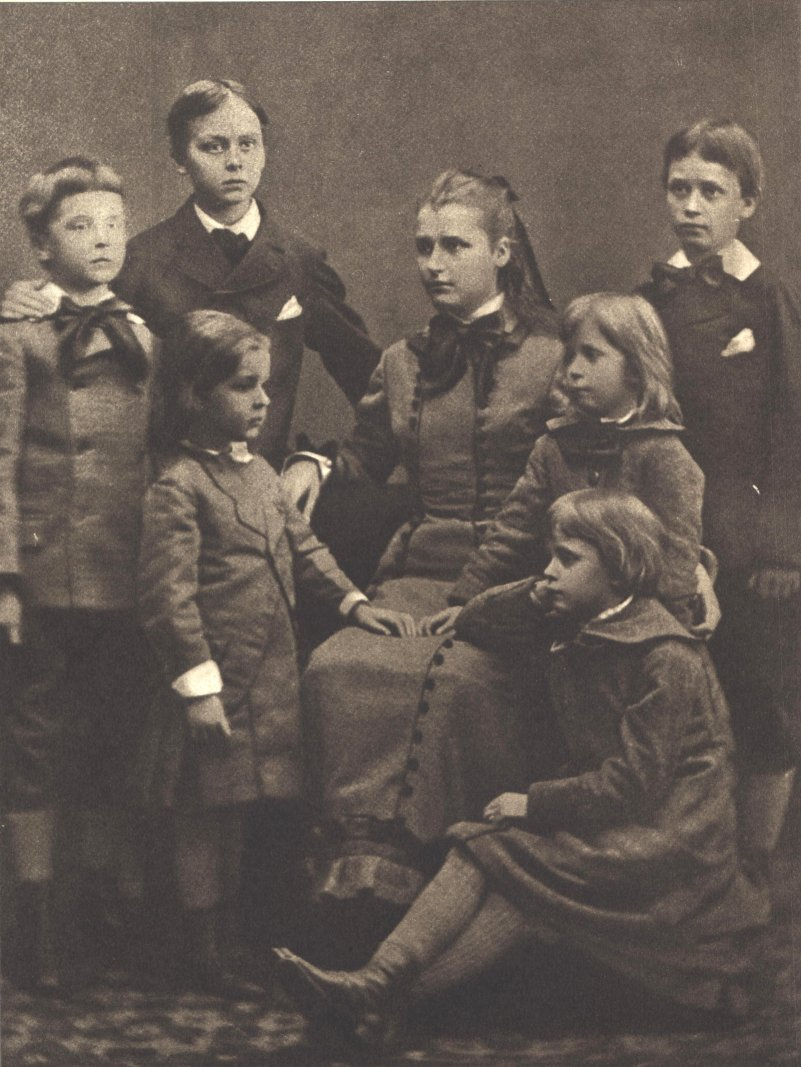
Their 7 children. Middle: Sophie Mannerheim; left: Carl, August and Johan; right: Annicka and Carl Gustaf Emil (i.e. Gustaf); sitting: Eva, c. 1880

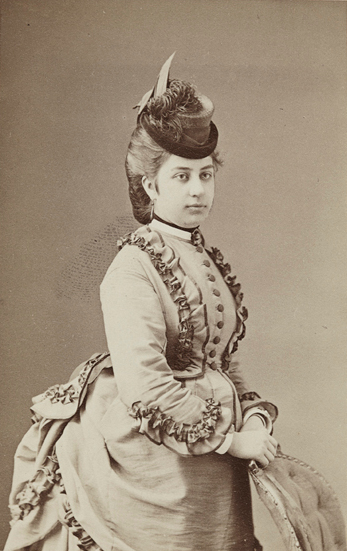
Carl Robert's second wife Sofia Nordenstam, 1872

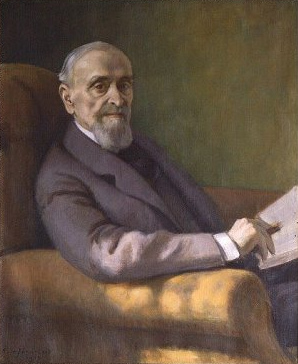
Portrait of Carl Robert Mannerheim by Eero Järnefelt, 1913
