= Johan Augustin Mannerheim =

Swedish nobleman and military leader (1706–1778)

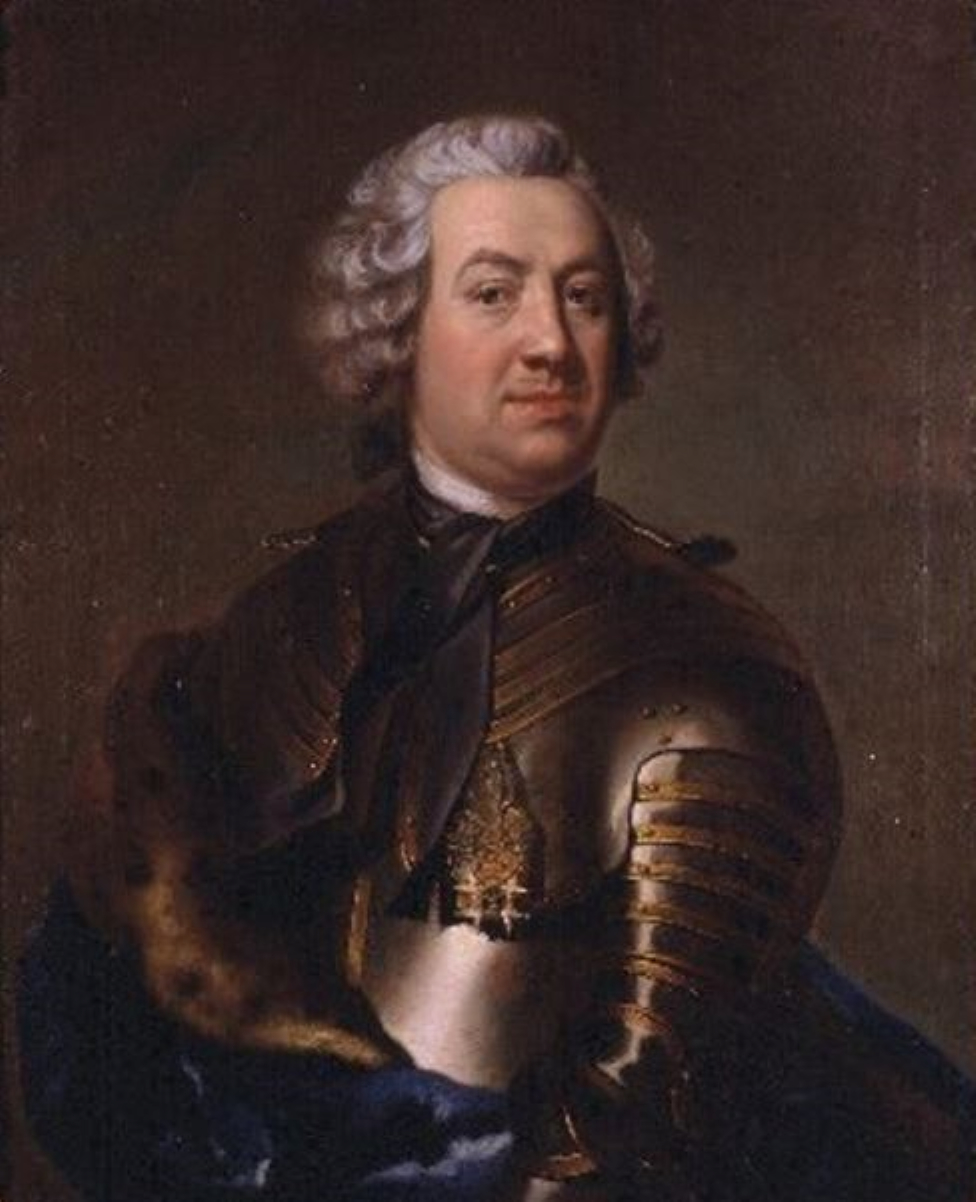
- Portrait by Johan Henrik Scheffel, c. 1750
- Born: 8 August 1706; Sweden
- Died: 26 August 1778 (aged 72); Tärnö, Nyköping, Sweden
- Title: Baron
- Spouse(s): Margareta Elisabet Nordenflycht; Helene Maria Söderhjelm
- Children: Baron Lars Augustin Mannerheim; Count Carl Erik Mannerheim
- Parent(s): Augustin Mannerheim; Anna Elisabet Olderman
- Relatives: Baron Carl Gustaf Emil Mannerheim (descendant)
- Family: Mannerheim

Baron Johan Augustin Mannerheim (8 August 1706 – 26 August 1778) was a Swedish nobleman, the Artillery Colonel and the Gothenburg Commandant. He was a great-great-grandfather of Baron C. G. E. Mannerheim, the Marshal of Finland.

== Biography ==
Mannerheim's parents were Augustin Mannerheim (formerly Marhein; 1654–1732) and Anna Elisabeth Olderman (1665–1737). He began his studies at Uppsala University in 1722, after which he served as an extra clerk on a judicial inspection trip in 1728. After joining the military service, he served as an artillery sergeant in Stockholm in 1729, as an artillery commander in 1730, as an ensign in 1733, and as a lieutenant in 1736. After moving to the Gotland artillery battalion, Mannerheim was promoted to captain in 1741, to major in 1747 and eventually to lieutenant colonel in 1750. After attaining the rank of colonel in 1761, he resigned from military service. In 1768, Mannerheim was granted the title of Baron.

Mannerheim was initially announced as married to his fiancée, the chamberlain's daughter Margareta Elisabet Nordenflycht (1714–1748), but this ended in divorce in 1744. They had time to have a daughter Johanna Elisabeth in 1741, who, however, died at the age of five. Finally, in 1747, he married the lieutenant colonel's daughter Helene Maria Söderhjelm (1722–1793) in the Västervåla Church. They had children Anna Maria (1748–1839), Lars Augustin (1749–1835), Gustava Charlotta (b. 1753), Gustaf Johan (1754–1826) and Carl Erik (1759–1837).

== See also ==
- Mannerheim (family)
