= John von Julin =

Finnish pharmacist and industrialist (1787–1853)

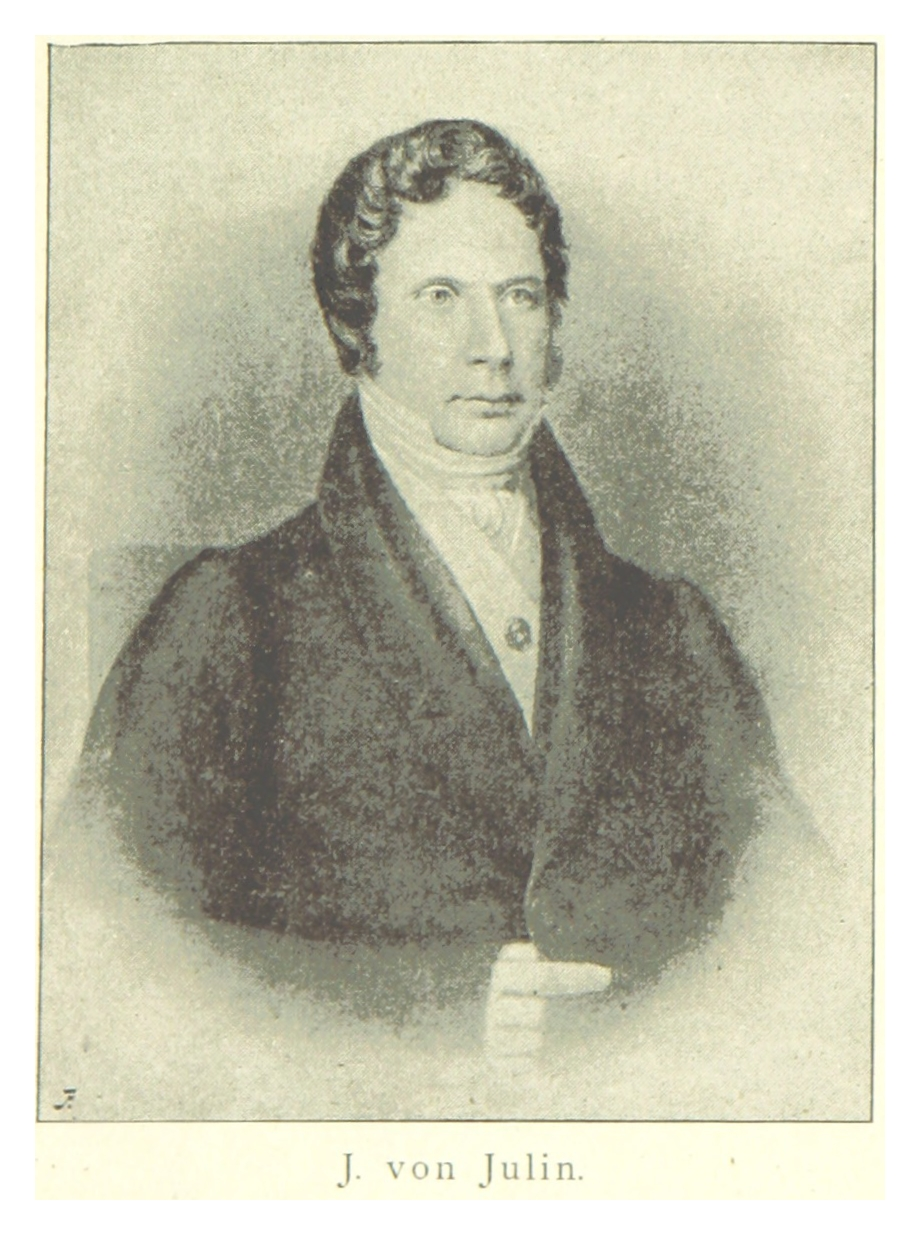
John von Julin

Johan (John) Jacob Julin (since 1849 von Julin; 5 August 1787 – 11 March 1853) was a Finland-Swedish pharmacist, factory owner and bergsråd. His son was Albert von Julin, a businessman and also a bergsråd. Through his daughter Hélène, he was also the maternal grandfather of Gustaf Mannerheim, the Marshal of Finland.

John, like his father Johan Julin (1752–1820) and younger brother Erik Julin (1796–1874), became a pharmacist. He practiced in his father's pharmacy in Oulu and went to Sweden in 1806 to study chemistry and practice in pharmacies. John Julin graduated as a pharmacy assistant in 1808 and as a master pharmacist in 1810. After graduating, John Julin returned to Finland and bought the pharmacy of the Imperial Academy of Turku (Åbo) in 1811. In 1822 Julin bought Fiskars Ironworks and founded a foundry there in 1827. In 1832 he founded Finland's first fine forge and in 1837 Finland's first mechanical machine shop, which the following year manufactured the first Finnish ship's steam engine. Julin was also an active player in other fields; in 1819 he founded the first steamship company in Finland. Finland's first savings bank was founded in Turku in 1823 on Julin's initiative, as was Finland's first Lancaster school in 1822.

In 1835, Julin was awarded the title of bergsråd. In 1849 he was ennobled as von Julin.

== Sources ==
- Arno Forsius: John (Johan) Jacob von Julin (1787–1853) – apteekkari ja teollisuusmies (in Finnish)
- Helsingin yliopiston opettaja- ja virkamiesluettelo 1918–2000: Erillislaitokset/Yliopiston apteekki (in Finnish)
- Familjen Martin Gardberg. Sukutauluja yksityishenkilön kotisivulla (in Finnish)
- Weilin + Göös: Suomen historia, osa 5 (1986), p. 68–69 (in Finnish)
- Mitä-Missä-Milloin, 1952, Suomen teollisuuden uranuurtajia, Otava, Helsinki, 1951, p. 226. (in Finnish)
- Fiskarsvillage.fi, Fiskarsin ruukin historiaa (in Finnish)
- Per Schybergson: Vuorineuvos John von Julin (1787–1853) Suomen talouselämän vaikuttajat -verkkojulkaisu 5 September 2009. Suomalaisen Kirjallisuuden Seura. (Internet archive) (in Finnish)
