= Carl Erik Mannerheim =

Swedish–Finnish nobleman and statesman (1759–1837)

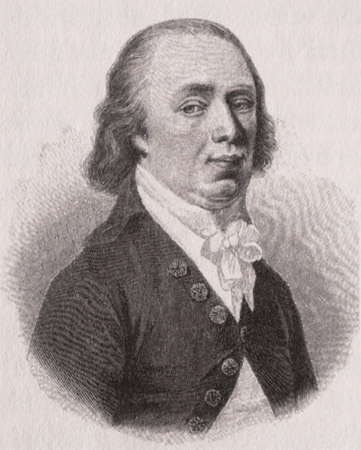
- Born: 14 December 1759; Säter, Sweden
- Died: 15 January 1837 (aged 77); Turku, Grand Duchy of Finland, Russian Empire
- Title: Vice Chairman of the Economic Division of the Senate of Finland
- Successor: Samuel Fredrik von Born (acting)
- Spouse: Vendla Sofia von Willebrand
- Children: Count Carl Gustaf Mannerheim; Baron August Erik Mannerheim
- Parent(s): Johan Augustin Mannerheim; Helene Maria Söderhjälm
- Relatives: Baron Carl Gustaf Emil Mannerheim
- Family: Mannerheim

Count Carl Erik Mannerheim (14 December 1759 – 15 January 1837) was a Swedish–Finnish soldier, statesman and member of the Senate of Finland as its first Vice Chairman of the Economic Division, an office corresponding to that of the modern Prime Minister.

== Biography ==
Carl Erik Mannerheim was born in Säter the third and youngest son of the Artillery Colonel and the Gothenburg Commandant, Johan Augustin Mannerheim (1706–1778) and his second spouse, Helene Maria Söderhjälm (1722–1793). His eldest brother was the prominent Swedish administrator Lars Augustin Mannerheim (1749–1835) and the middle brother Gustaf Johan Mannerheim (1754–1826) was the most significant ancestor of the Swedish branch of the Mannerheim family.

Mannerheim studied at Uppsala University, which he left to pursue his military career. He joined the Anjala conspiracy against the King of Sweden, Gustav III. As a result, he was sentenced to death, however, he was pardoned. He left the army in 1795. In 1796 he married Baroness Vendla Sofia von Willebrand, daughter of Baron Ernst Gustaf von Willebrand, a wealthy general and governor of Turku and Pori Province 1790–1806, and his wife Wendla Gustava Wright and maternal aunt of Aurora Karamzin.

In 1809 Mannerheim became a member of the Diet of Porvoo and took part in the creation of Grand Duchy's institutions. He was the main figure in the Finnish delegation sent to the Russian Emperor that discussed Finland's future within the tsar's realm.

He became the first Vice Chairman of the Economic Division of the Senate of Finland in 1822 and served until 1826.

He was a great grandfather of Carl Gustaf Emil Mannerheim.

== Gallery ==
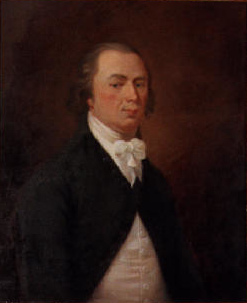
Portrait of young Mannerheim

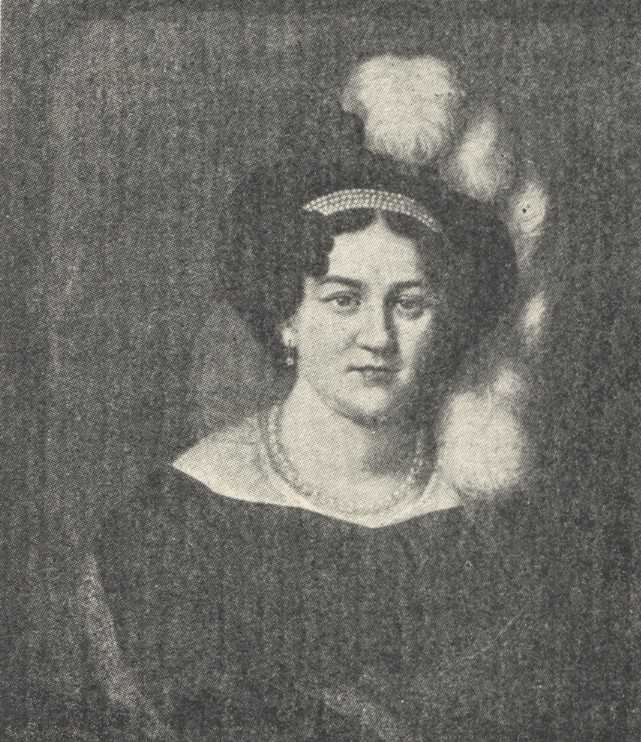
His wife Vendla Sofia von Willebrand

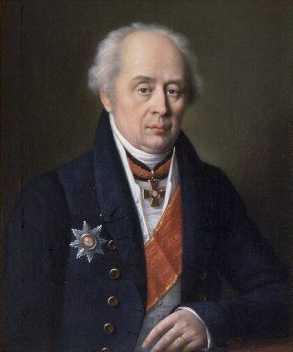
Portrait by Józef Oleszkiewicz, 1825

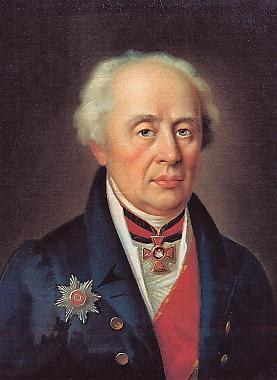
Portrait of old Mannerheim

== Sources ==
- Biografiskt lexikon för Finland (in Swedish)
