= Louhisaari manor =

Coordinates: 60.570944°N 21.831134°E

Louhisaari Manor
- Louhisaaren kartano Villnäs slott
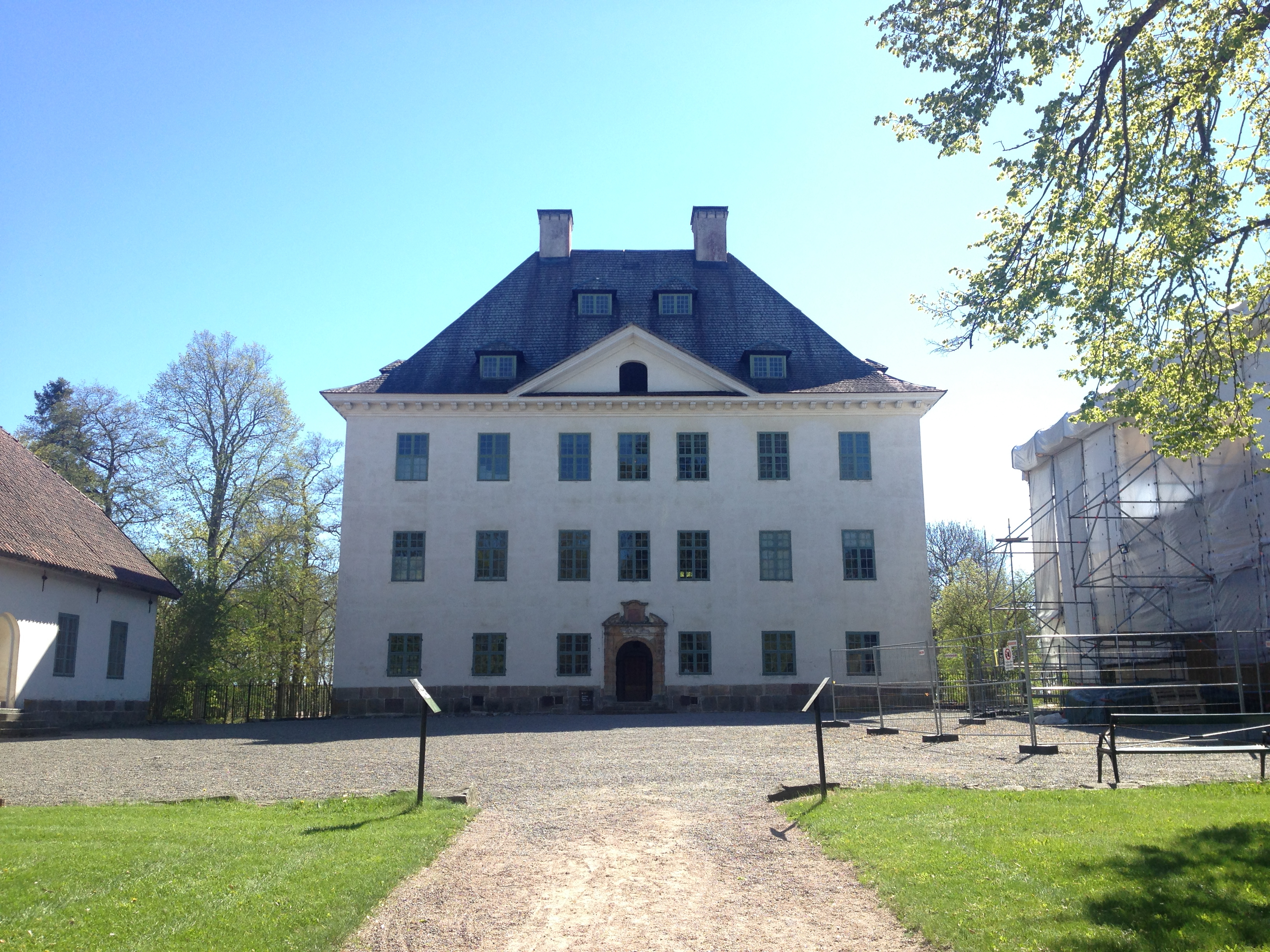
- Louhisaari Manor façade

- Location within Finland

General information
- Architectural style: Palladian, Late Renaissance
- Location: Askainen, Masku, Southwest Finland, Finland
- Owner: Government of Finland
- Governing body: Finnish Heritage Agency

Design and construction
- Architect: Herman Claesson Fleming (probable)

Louhisaari Manor (Finnish: Louhisaaren kartano or Swedish: Villnäs slott) is a historic baroque manor house in Askainen in the municipality of Masku, Western Finland Province, Finland. The mansion is the birthplace and childhood home of Carl Gustaf Emil Mannerheim, Finnish military leader, statesman and sixth president of Finland (1944–1946).

== History ==
The Fleming family acquired the Louhisaari estate around the middle of the 15th century. The Louhisaari Flemings held prominent offices in the kingdom of Sweden (including Finland). Herman Claesson Fleming, admiral and governor of Finland, constructed the manor in 1655. After three hundred years, the financially pressed Fleming family had to sell the house.

The Mannerheim family acquired the manor in 1795. Known residents were Carl Gustaf Mannerheim, a Finnish entomologist and governor of the Viipuri province, and his grandson Marshal Carl Gustaf Emil Mannerheim, who was born here in 1867. Baroness Wilhelmina Mannerheim moved to Sweden and sold the house to Oskar Hannus in 1903. A charity committee in honour of Marshal Mannerheim purchased the mansion and donated it to the Finnish State in 1965, which opened it as a museum for visitors in 1967. The museum gave a good presentation of the ways of life of people in Finland from to the 17th to the 19th centuries. In October 2024, it was announced that the museum would be closed due to budget cuts by Petteri Orpo's government affecting the Finnish Heritage Agency. However, the government gave initial funds to keep the museum open for the public.

== Architecture & design ==
The house is a fine and rare example of a Palladian-style country house in Finland. The architect is unknown, but some presume Herman Fleming, the owner, to be the builder and designer. During its history, the buildings (manor and annexes) more or less remained in their original form, but were subject to renovations and repair. During the restoration of the 1960s, the exterior was restored back to its 17th century style as much as possible. The first and third floor of the manor were also restored in 17th century style, while the second floor was brought back to the 18th and 19th century design.

The house is surrounded by a park in English landscape style.

== Fundraising campaign ==
Louhisaari inaugurated a fundraising campaign in 2025. As part of the initiative, each donor is symbolically allocated one square meter of land at Louhisaari for the duration of one year. In recognition of their support, contributors are also conferred the honorary designations "Friend of Louhisaari" and "Honorary Herman." The campaign is placed under the patronage of countess Margaretha Mannerheim.

== Gallery ==
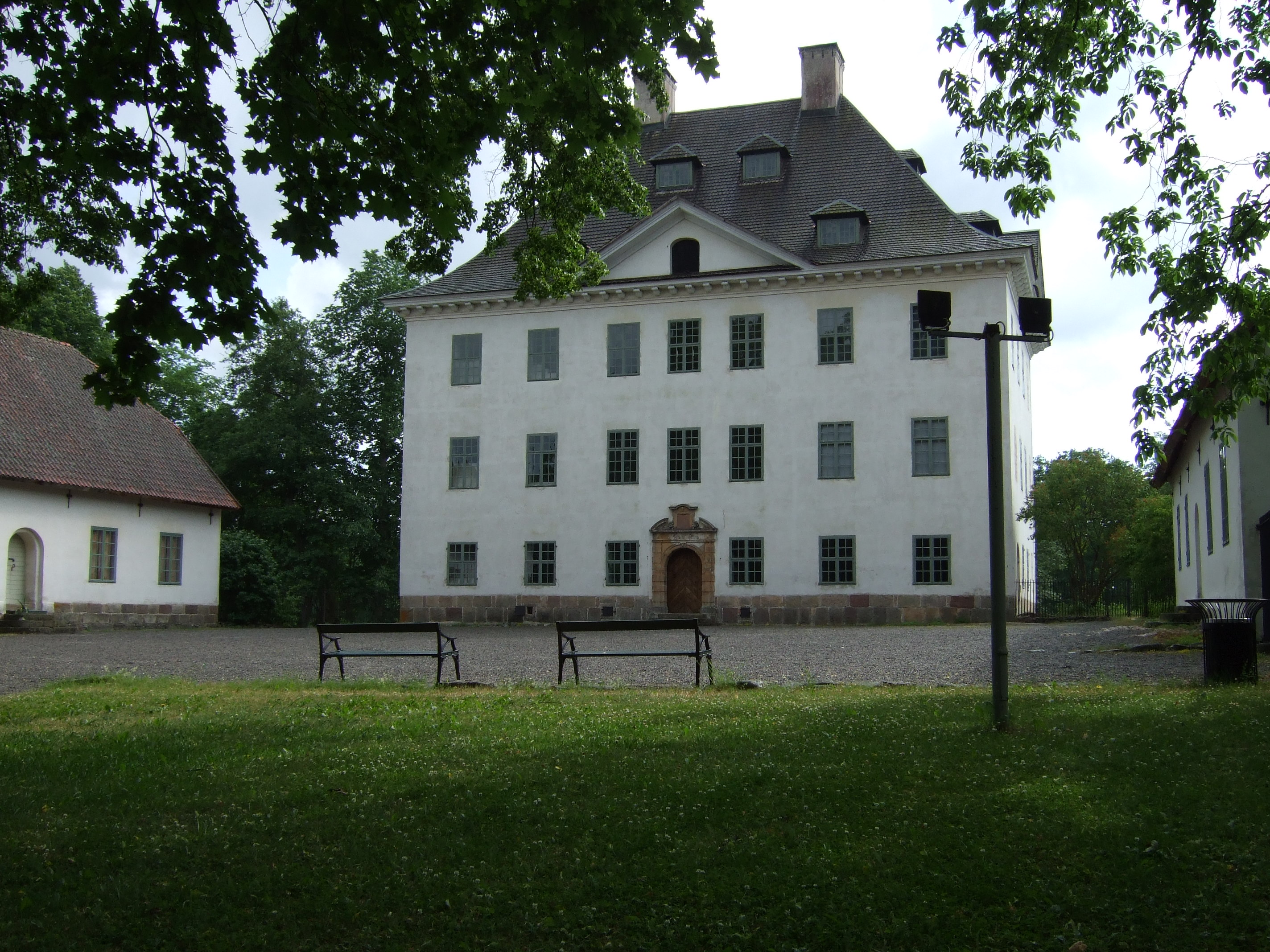
The entrance facade

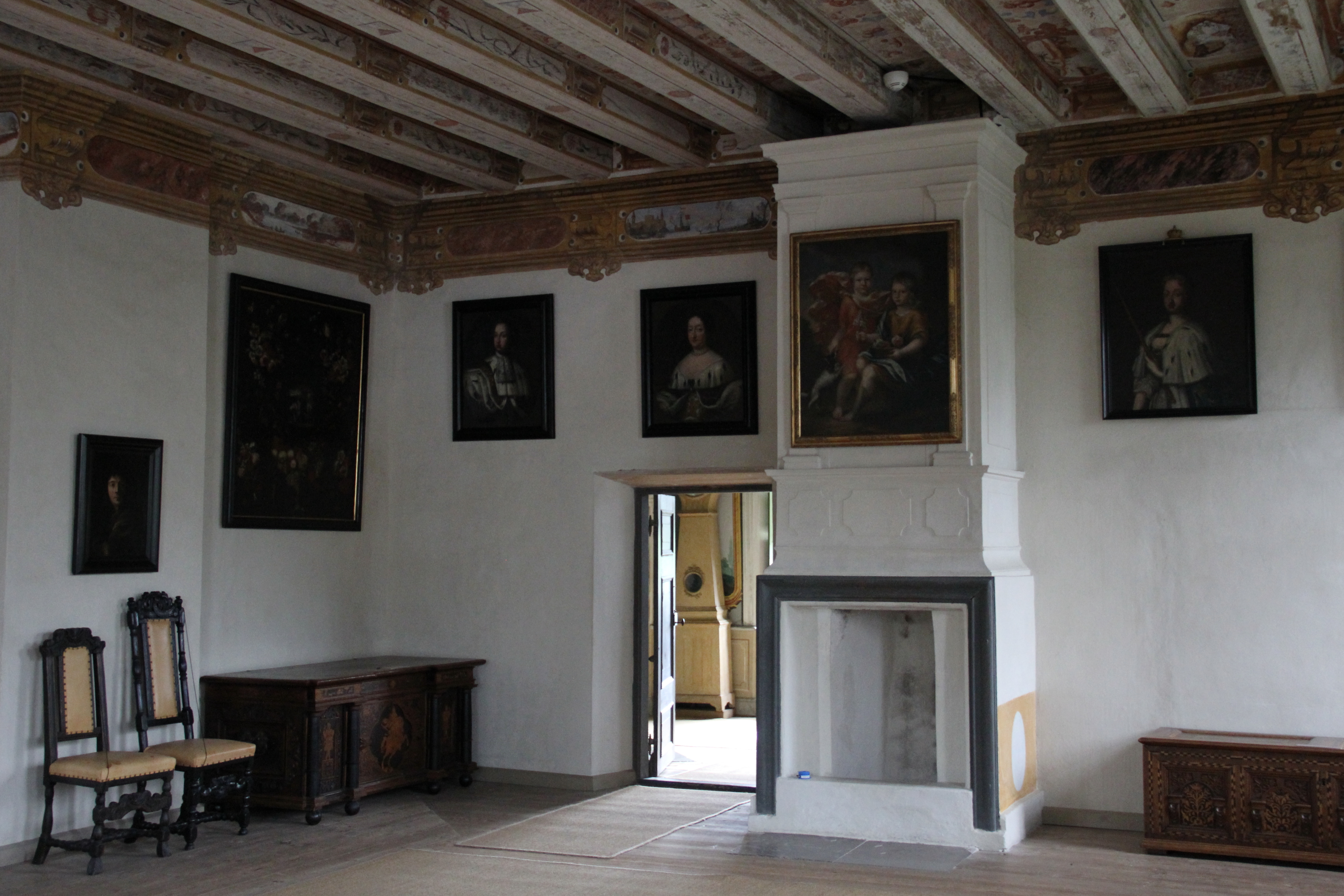
A view of the interior

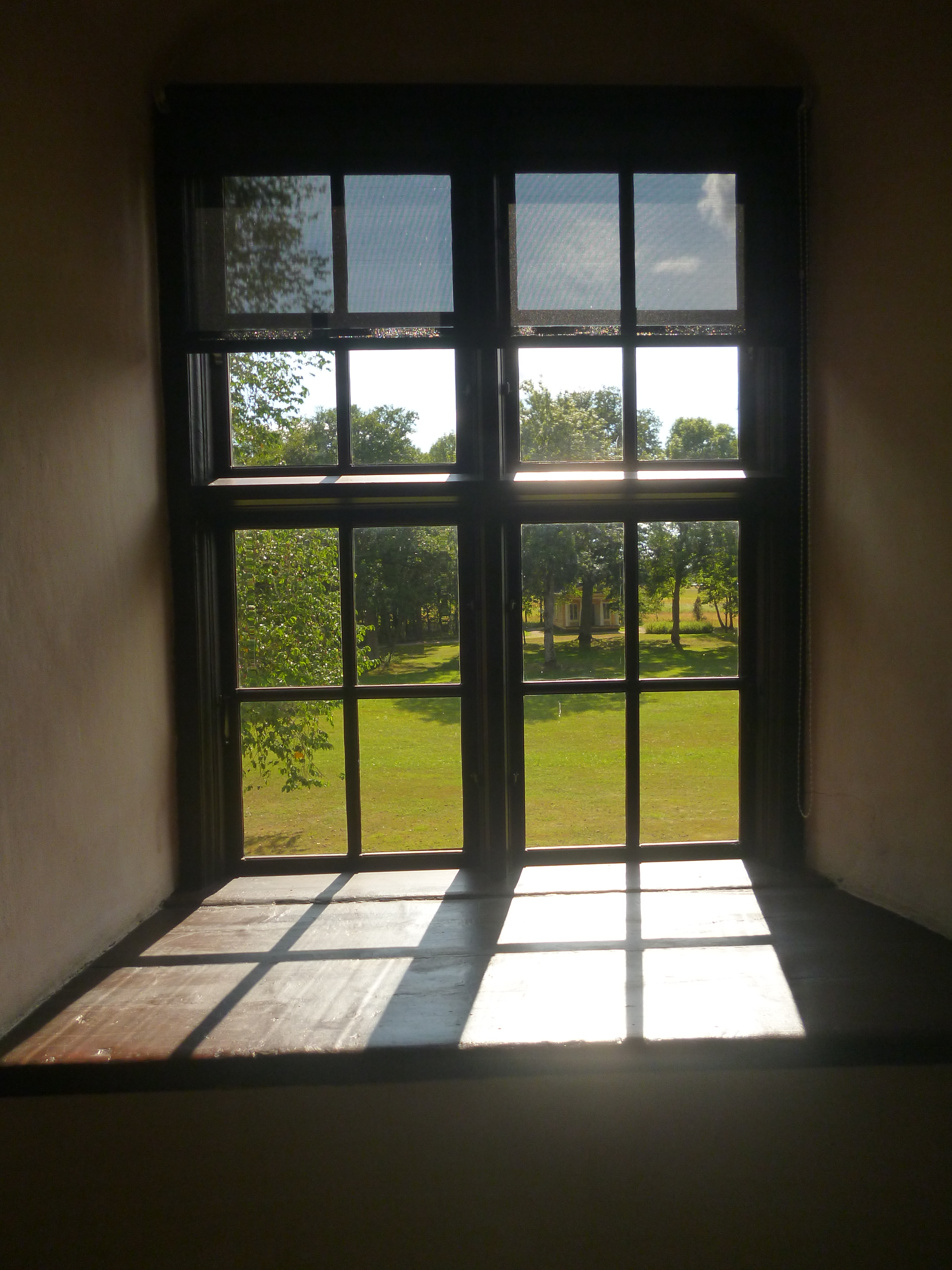
A look out of the window

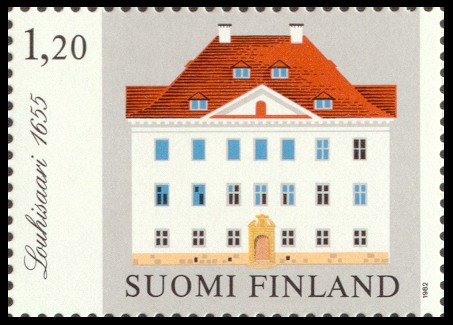
A Finnish stamp in honor of Louhisaari Manor

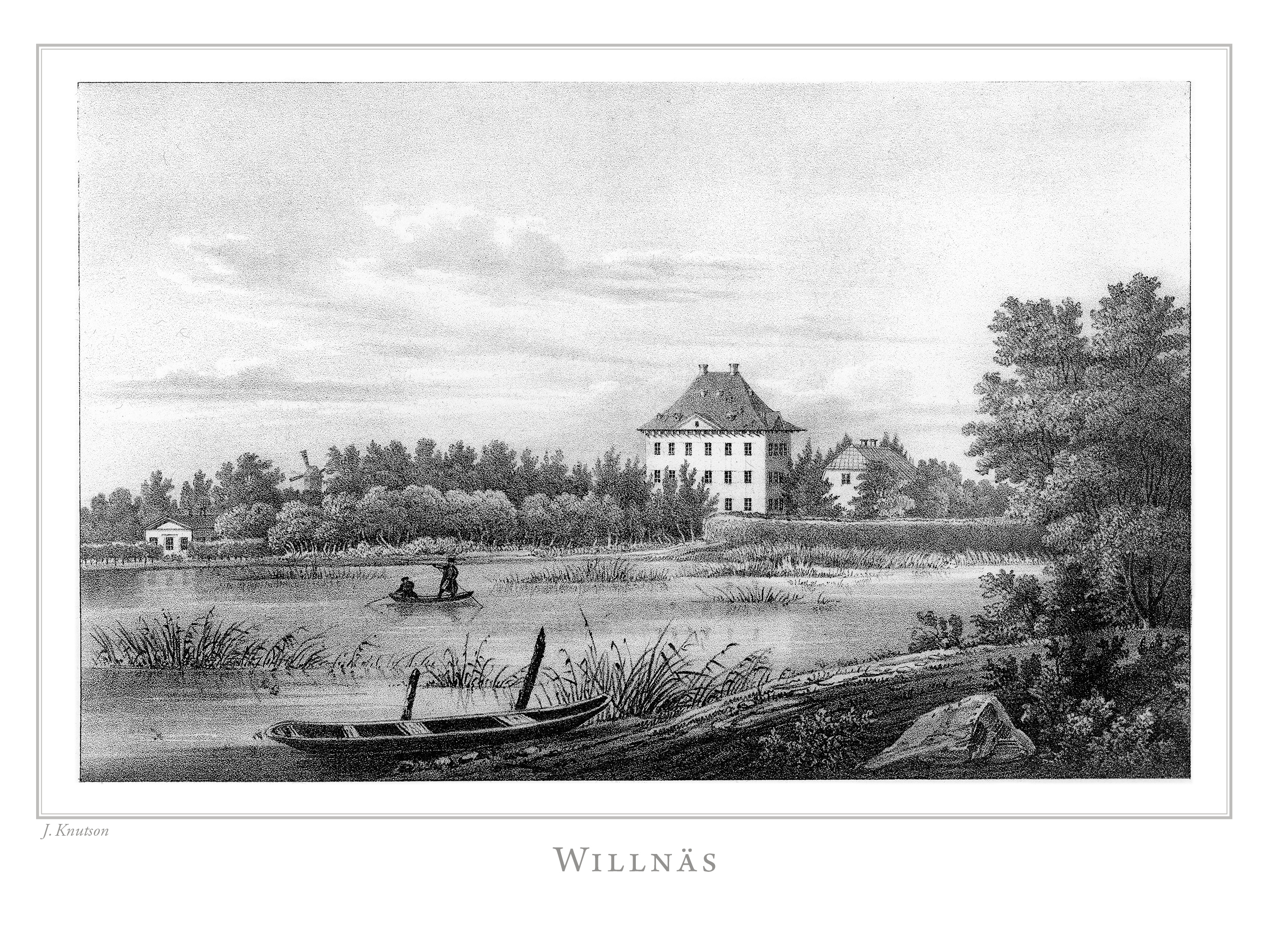
Illustration in Finland framstäldt i teckningar edited by Zacharias Topelius and published 1845-1852.
