= Sophie Mannerheim =

Finnish baroness and nurse (1863–1928)

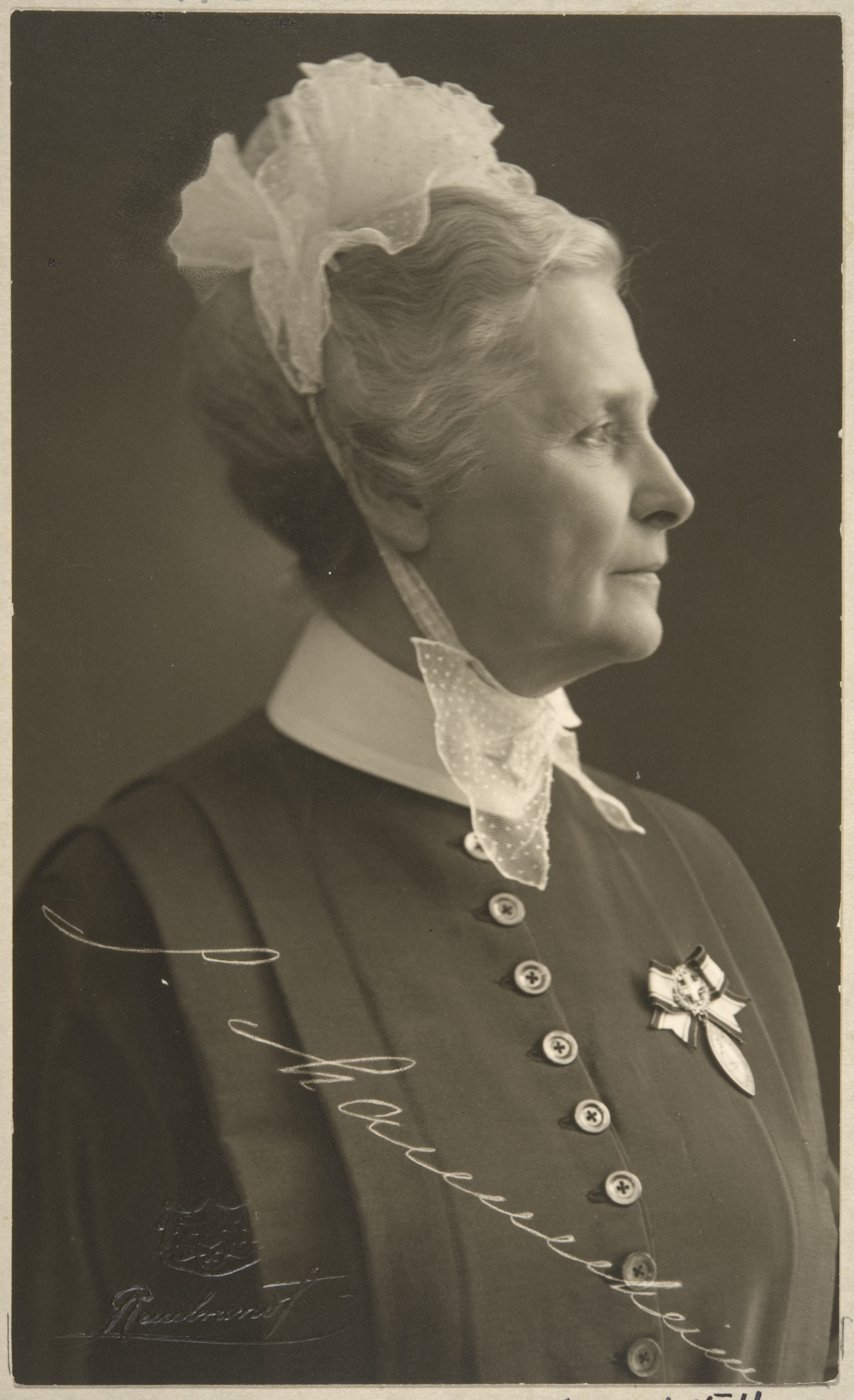
Sophie Mannerheim.

Baroness Eva Charlotta Lovisa Sofia (Sophie) Mannerheim (21 December 1863 – 9 January 1928) was a famous nurse known as a pioneer of modern nursing in Finland. She was a daughter of count Carl Robert Mannerheim and a sister of former Finnish President, Marshal Carl Gustaf Emil Mannerheim, and of the artist and writer Eva Mannerheim-Sparre. Mannerheim was president of Finnish Nurses' Association and also of the International Council of Nurses. She was awarded the Florence Nightingale Medal in 1925. A primary and hospital school in Helsinki is named after her.

== Early life and education ==
Mannerheim was born in Helsinki on 21 December 1863. She was the eldest daughter of Count Carl Robert Mannerheim and Hedvig Charlotta Helena von Julin, and she was a sister of former Finnish President, Marshal Carl Gustaf Emil Mannerheim, and of the artist and writer Eva Mannerheim-Sparre.

Mannerheim trained as a teacher in Stockholm from 1881, and worked as a governess before returning to Finland, where she worked as a bank employee for six years. In 1896. Mannerheim married Hjalmar Constantin Linder, a family friend, but they divorced in 1902.

== Nursing career ==
In 1899 Mannerheim began training in nursing at the Nightingale School at St Thomas' Hospital in London. Returning home in 1904 she was appointed head nurse of Helsinki Surgical Hospital. Mannerheim advocated for nursing as a professional discipline, and overhauled the nursing education offered at the nursing school, from a one-year practical training to a period of practical training followed by three years of further education.

In 1905 Mannerheim was elected president of the Finnish Nurses' Association, a position she held for 24 years. She also co-founded the Northern Nurses’ Federation in 1920. Mannerheim was, together with Dr Arvo Ylppö, co-founder of the Children's Castle (Lastenlinna) hospital in Helsinki as well as the Mannerheim League for Child Welfare.

As a result of her international involvement, Mannerheim was also elected president of the International Council of Nurses (ICN) in 1922, taking over from Henny Tscherning. Christiane Reimann was elected secretary at the same time. Mannerheim oversaw a period of growth in the organisation, after the low point at the end of the WWI. During her tenure eight memberships were added, and complex issues handled, including training standards for nurses, and disagreements over nurses’ representation in the international community.

Mannerheim was awarded the 1925 Florence Nightingale Medal.

Mannerheim died on 9 January 1928. The Sophie Mannerheim School, a primary and hospital school in Helsinki, is named after her.
