= Pojo, Finland =

Pojo Pohja
- Former municipality
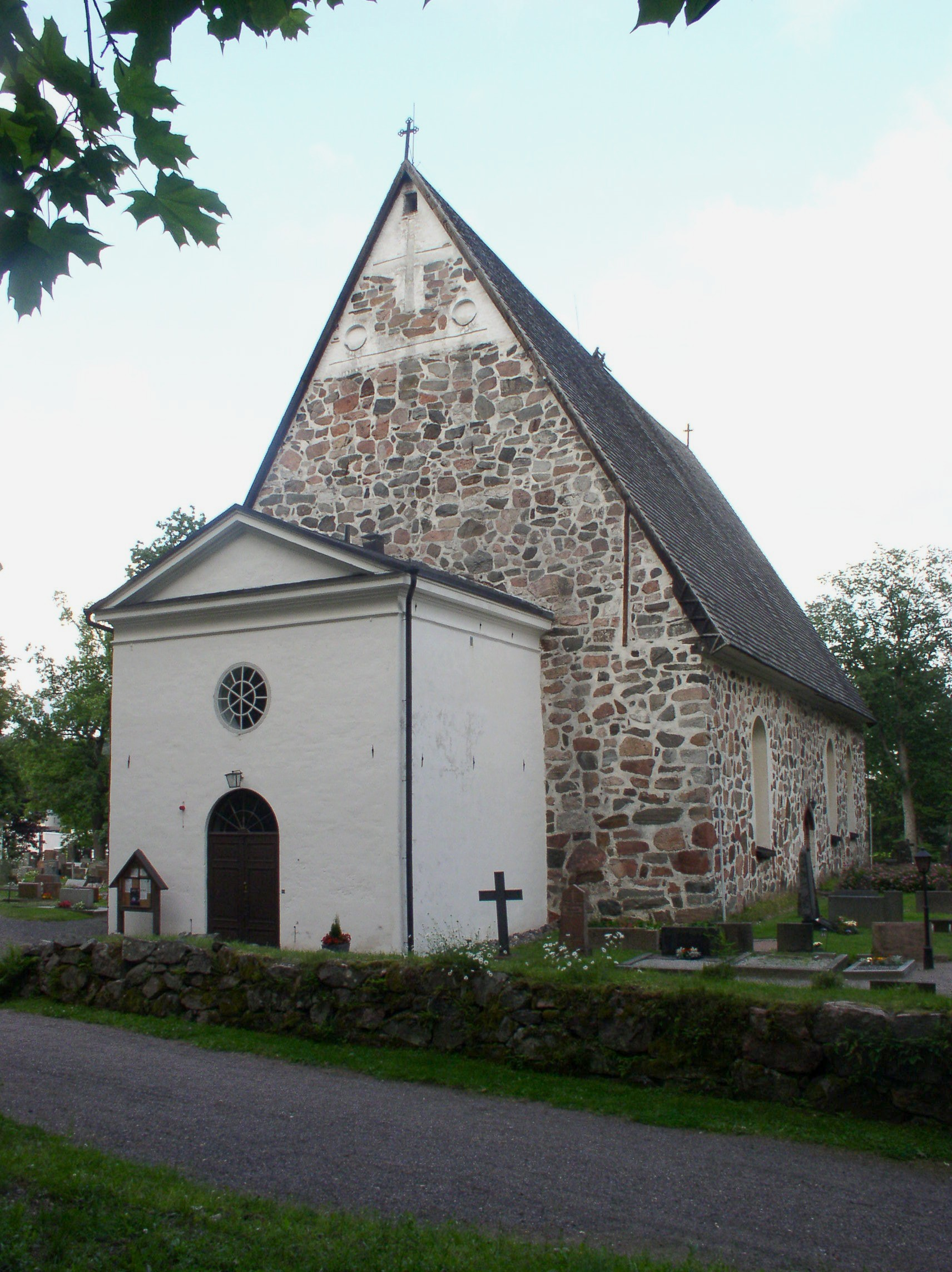
- Pohja Church

- Coat of arms

- Location of Pojo in Finland
- Interactive map of Pojo
- Location within Uusimaa Location within Finland Location within Europe
- Coordinates: 60°06′N 023°31.5′E
- Country: Finland
- Region: Uusimaa
- Sub-region: Ekenäs sub-region
- Consolidated: 2009

Area
  - Total: 266.13 km^{2} (102.75 sq mi)
  - Land: 224.66 km^{2} (86.74 sq mi)
  - Water: 41.47 km^{2} (16.01 sq mi)

Population (2008-12-31)
  - Total: 4,936
  - Density: 21.97/km^{2} (56.90/sq mi)
- Time zone: UTC+2 (EET)
  - Summer (DST): UTC+3 (EEST)
- Climate: Dfb

Pojo (Swedish pronunciation: [ˈpu:ju]; Finnish: Pohja, Finnish pronunciation: [ˈpohjɑ]) is a former municipality of Finland. It was consolidated with Ekenäs and Karis to form the new town of Raseborg in 2009.

It is located in the province of Southern Finland and is part of the Uusimaa region. The municipality had a population of 4,936 (as of 31 December 2008) and covered a land area of 224.66 square kilometres (86.74 sq mi). The population density was 21.97 inhabitants per square kilometre (56.9/sq mi).

The former municipality was bilingual, with majority being Finnish (60%) and minority Swedish (40%) speakers. Pohja is one of the birthplaces of the Finnish metal industry. Fiskars Corporation was founded near Pohja in 1649 and remains the largest employer in municipality area to date.

== Name ==
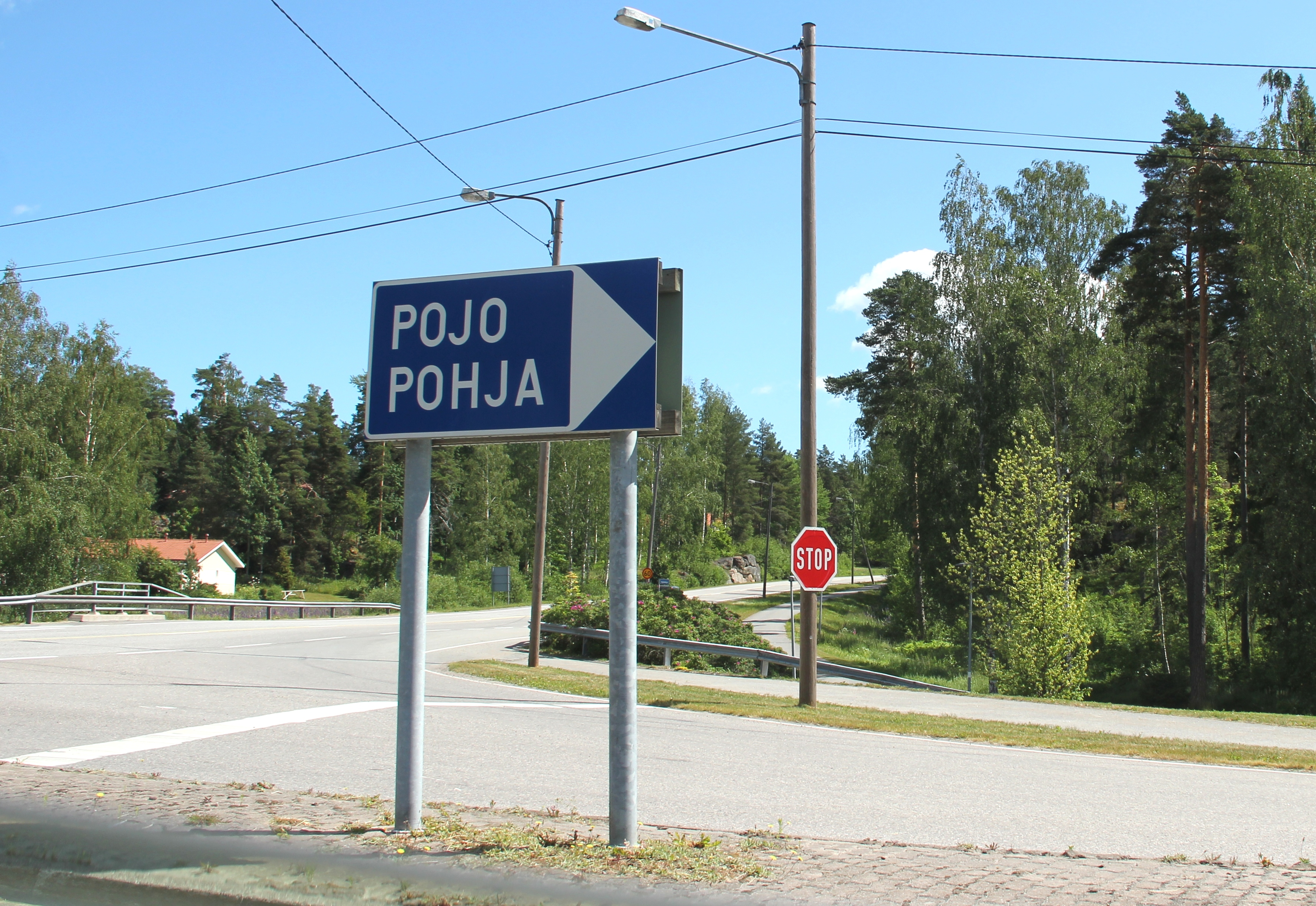
Intersection with a road sign pointing toward Pojo/Pohja (2019)

The locality is first documented in written sources under its Swedish name: Poyæ (1335), Poijo (1351), Poija (1359), and Pojo (1427). The Finnish name appears later, first recorded as Pohjan pitäjä (“the parish of Pohja”) in 1848.

The centre of the historical parish is located at the innermost end ("bottom") of the bay known in Finnish as Pohjanpitäjänlahti (also Pohjanlahti). The place name refers to this geographical position; in this context Finnish pohja means "bottom" or "innermost part of a bay", comparable to the German term Bodden. The name was apparently given by early settlers from Häme, for whom the bay constituted an important waterway toward the Baltic Sea. Swedish-speaking settlers adopted the name in the form Pojo, which subsequently became the established form in Swedish usage. Before it was used as the name of the parish, it likely referred to the central settlement. The modern Finnish form Pohja represents a back-formation based on the Swedish name.

== Villages ==
Villages located within the former municipality are: Antkärr, Antskog (fi. Ansku), Baggby, Billnäs (fi. Pinjainen), Björsby, Bockboda, Bollstad, Borgby, Brunkom, Brödtorp, Böle, Dalkarby, Degernäs, Ekerö, Elimo, Fiskars, Forsby, Gammelby, Gennäs, Grabbskog, Grännäs, Gumnäs, Gästerby, Hindraböle, Hällskulla, Järnvik, Kila, Klinkbacka, Kockböle (en del av Persböle), Koppskog, Kvarnby, Kyrkbacka, Lillfors, Munckbacka, Mörby, Nygård, Näsby, Pentby, Persböle, Ramskulla, Sidsbacka, Sjösäng, Skarpkulla, Skogböle (fi. Kuovila), Skogäng, Skrittskog, Skuru, Slicko, Sonabacka, Spakanäs, Starrböle, Stålbacka, Sunnanvik, Svedjeby, Sällvik, Torby, Trädbollstad, Åminne and Åminnefors.

== Notable residents ==
- Charles Linn – one of the founders of Birmingham, Alabama
- Peter Lindroos – opera singer
- Hedvig Sohlberg — educator, lecturer, reformer, politician
