= Carl Gustaf Mannerheim (naturalist) =

Finnish entomologist (1797–1854)

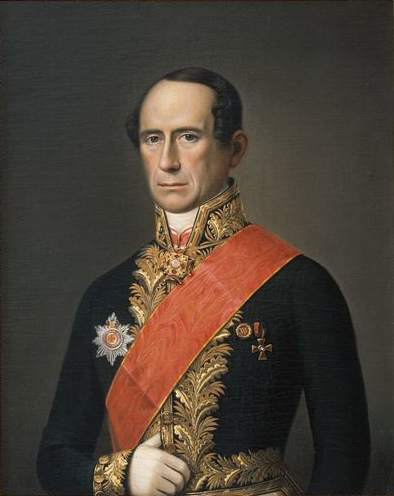
- Portrait of Mannerheim by Johan Erik Lindh, 1849–1851
- Born: 10 August 1797; Askainen, Sweden
- Died: 9 October 1854 (aged 57); Stockholm, Sweden
- Spouse: Eva Wilhelmina von Schantz
- Children: Count Carl Robert Mannerheim
- Parent(s): Count Carl Erik Mannerheim; Vendla Sofia von Willebrand
- Relatives: Baron Carl Gustaf Emil Mannerheim
- Family: Mannerheim

Count Carl Gustaf Mannerheim (10 August 1797 – 9 October 1854) was a Finnish nobleman, amateur entomologist and governor of the Viipuri province in the Grand Duchy of Finland. He collected beetles from across the Arctic region from Alaska to Russia through northern Scandinavia making use of a network of aristocratic amateurs and Finnish settlers resulting in a personal collection of nearly 100,000 specimens of beetles representing 20,000 species made over a period of 40 years.

== Life and career ==
Mannerheim was born in Askainen, the son of Vendla Sofia von Willebrand and Count Carl Erik Mannerheim (1759–1837), the first vice-chairman of the finance ministry of the senate, now equivalent to being the Prime Minister of Finland. He graduated from the University of Turku in 1819 where he was influenced by the teaching of C. R. Sahlberg. Shortly after graduating he became the secretary to the Finnish Minister Secretary of State in Saint Petersburg. In 1833 he was appointed governor of the Vaasa Province and soon after of Viipuri and Savonlinna County. From 1835 he served as the chief judge of the newly formed Imperial Court of Appeals ("Kayserlichen Hofgerichtes", hovioikeus) in Vyborg.

== Scientific contributions ==
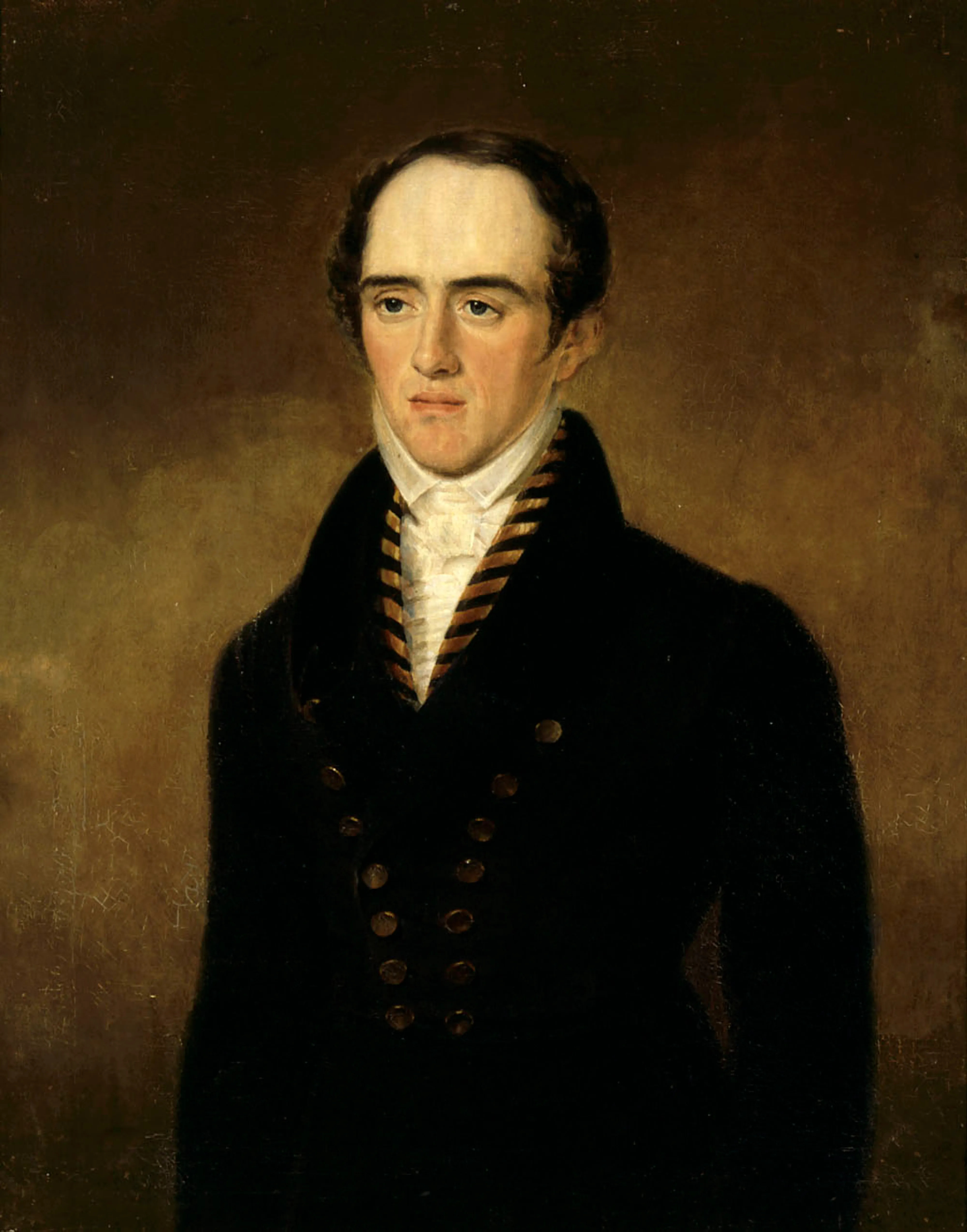
Portrait by Gustaf Wilhelm Finnberg, 1823–1825

Mannerheim devoted much of his time to natural sciences and acquired a significant scientific collection of Coleoptera. He published many papers concerning them and worked on the collections of the natural history museums of Dorpat, Saint-Petersburg and Moscow. He contributed greatly to the knowledge of the coleopteran fauna of western North America (then Russian America). Through a network of aristocratic collectors across Finland, Sweden and Russia, he amassed a collection of 100,000 specimens representing 20,000 species over a 4-decade period. His mentor was Carl Reinhold Sahlberg (1779–1860) whose son Reinhold Ferdinand Sahlberg (1811–1874) remained a close associate. The interest in the region from Russia to Alaska was begun by Johann Friedrich von Eschscholtz (1793–1831). Mannerheim made use of Finnish settlers in Sitka and other places to collect insects for him. He published on the insects from his collections in four monographs and other minor publications. He also collaborated with other zoologists including Fredrik Wilhelm Mäklin, Viktor I. Motschulsky, and Edouard Ménétriés. Mäklin named a genus of staphylind beetle Mannerheimia arctica after him. Other beetles named after him include Rhynchites mannerheimii Hummel, 1823 (Attelabidae); Bembidium mannerheimii Sahlbeg, 1827 (Carabidae); Haltica mannerheimii Gyllenhal, 1827 (Chrysomelidae); Oxyporus mannerheimii Gyllenhal, 1827 (Staphylinidae); Nebria mannerheimii Fischer von Waldheim, 1828 (Carabidae); Anchomenus mannerheimii Dejean, 1828 (Carabidae); Agaocephala mannerheimii Castelnau, 1832 (Scarabaeidae); and Dermestes mannerheimii LeConte, 1854 (Dermestidae). A fly Dolichopus mannerheimi was also named after him by Zetterstedt in 1838.

== Publications ==
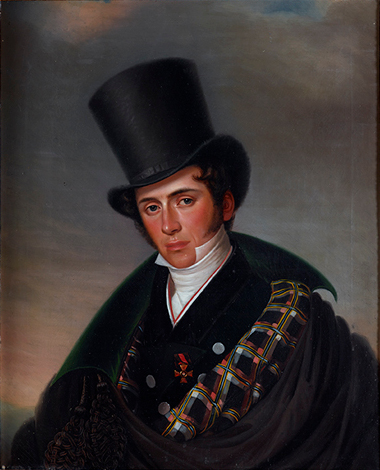
Portrait from 1828–1830

- Mannerheim, C. G. von. 1825. Novae coleopterorum species imperii Rossici incolae descriptae, in Hummel, Essais entomologiques, 1(4):19-41.
- Mannerheim, C. G. von. 1837. Enumération des Buprestides, et description de quelques nouvelles espèces de cette tribu de la famille des Sternoxes, de la collection de M. Le Comte Mannerheim. Bulletin de la Société Impériale des Naturalistes de Moscou 8:1-126.
- Mannerheim, C. G. von. 1837. Mémoire sur quelques genres et espèces de Carabiques
- Mannerheim, C. G. von. 1844. Description de quelques nouvelles espèces de Coléoptères de Finlande
- Mannerheim, C. G. von. 1843.Mémoire sur la récolte d'insectes coléoptères faite en 1842
- Mannerheim, C. G. von. 1843. Beitrag zur Käferfauna der Aleutischen Inseln, der Insel Sitkha und Neu-Californiens. Bulletin de la Société Impériale des Naturalistes de Moscou 16:3–142.
- Mannerheim, C. G. von. 1844. Lettre a S. E. Mr. Fischer de Waldheim ou relation d un voyage fait en 1844, en Suede, en Danemarck et dans nord de l'Allemagne. Bull. Soc. Imp. Nat. Moscou, 17: 844–872.
- Mannerheim, C. G. von. 1852. Insectes Coléoptères de la Sibérie orientale nouveaux ou peu connus. Bulletin de la Société Impériale des Naturalistes de Moscou, 25:273–309.
- Mannerheim, C. G. von. 1853. Dritter Nachtrag zur Kefer-Fauna der Nord-Amerykanischen Laender der Russischen Reiches. Bulletin de la Société Impériale des Naturalistes de Moscou, 3:3–181.

== Societies and organizations ==
Mannerheim was a member of the St Petersburg Academy of Sciences (1827) and of the Finnish Society of Sciences and Letters (1838) and a foreign member of the Royal Swedish Academy of Sciences (1852). He was decorated with the Cross of the Order of Saint Stanislaus and was made a knight of the Order of Saint Vladimir.

== Personal life ==
Mannerheim married Eva Wilhelmina von Schantz; they had a son Carl Robert Mannerheim, who was an aristocrat and businessman. Carl Robert's son Baron Carl Gustaf Emil Mannerheim (1867–1951) became Marshal and President of Finland. Their daughter Anna (1840–???) married the explorer Baron Adolf Erik Nordenskiöld (1832–1901).
