= Maternity package =

Kit provided to parents who live in Finland

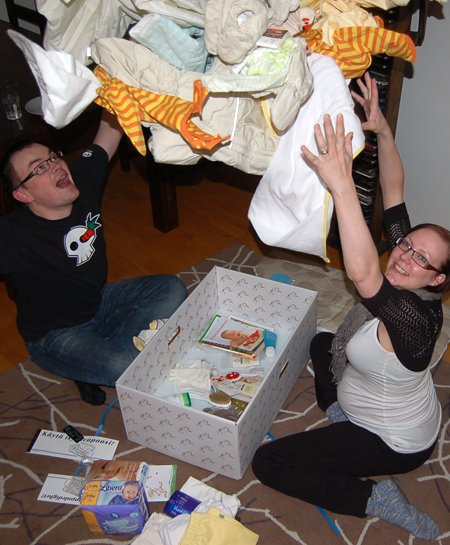
A Finnish couple rejoice in opening their maternity package

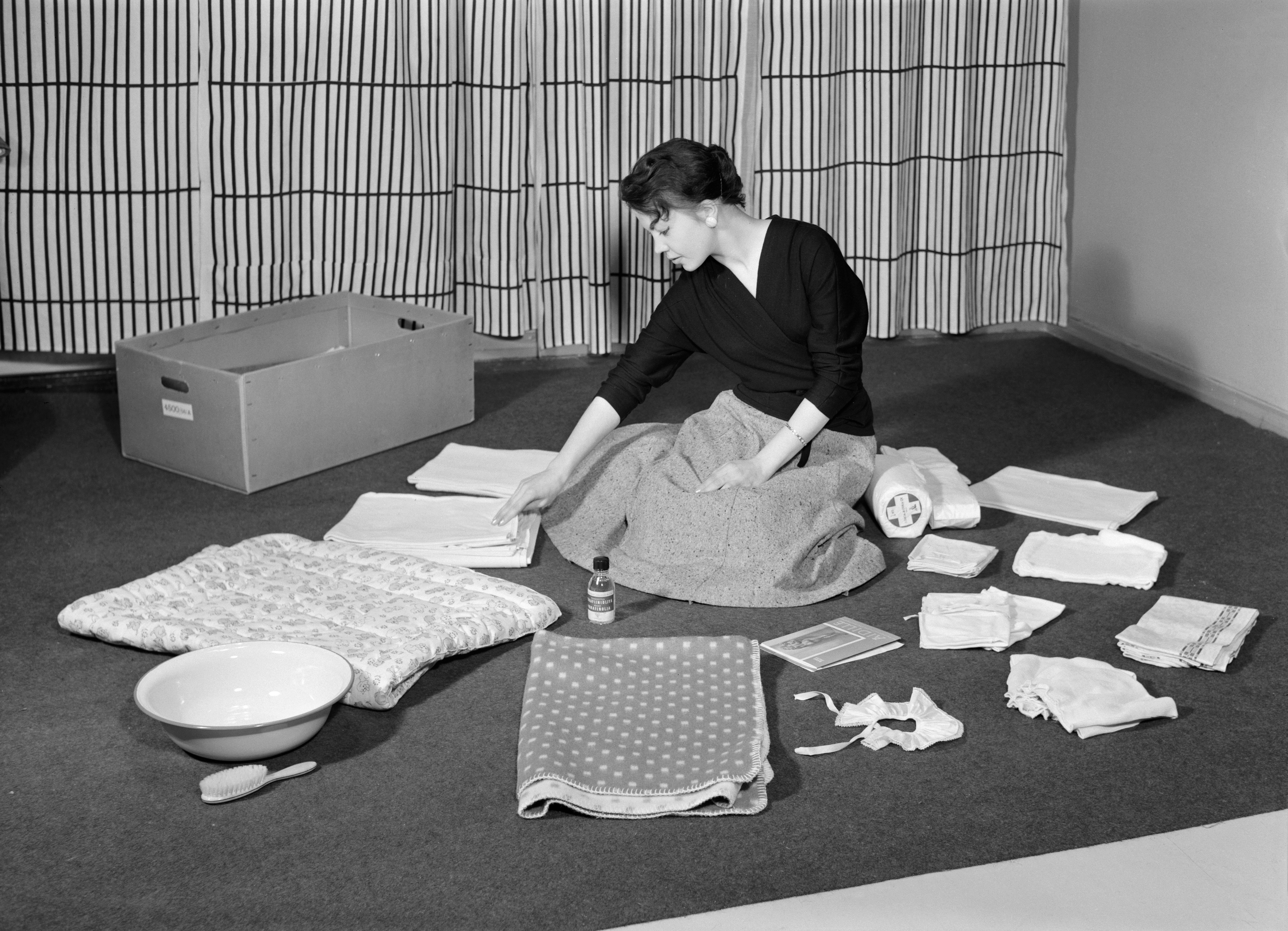
Contents of a Finnish maternity package in 1957

The maternity package (Finnish: äitiyspakkaus, Swedish: moderskapsförpackning), known internationally as the Finnish "baby box," is a kit first granted by the Finnish social security institution Kela, to all expectant or adoptive parents who live in Finland or are covered by the Finnish social security system. The package contained children's clothes and other necessary items, such as diapers (nappies), bedding, cloth, gauze towels and child-care products. It was first issued in 1938 to parents with a low income, and contained a blanket, crib sheets, diapers, and fabric that parents could use to make clothing for the baby.

Since 1949 it has been given to all Finnish mothers-to-be, provided they visited a doctor or municipal pre-natal clinic before the end of their fourth month of pregnancy, and the pregnancy has lasted at least 154 days. The contents of the package are updated approximately every year. A mother may choose to take the maternity package, or a cash grant of 170 euros; 87% of Finnish mothers choose the box because it is worth significantly more. Between 2006 and 2019, the total maternity grant program cost an average of 10.3 million euros per year, with 7 million euros being spent on maternity packages and 3.3 million euros given out as cash benefits or adoption grants. The maternity packages each year cost between 183 euros and 223 euros, averaging 190 euros each over the full 14-year period; an average of 37,000 boxes are given out each year.

Following a BBC story in June 2013, the baby box began to receive international attention. Similar packages, commercial or state-sponsored, are being supported in other countries. Private companies have started selling packages purporting to be the "Finnish baby box" or similar to it, but the original boxes are not sold commercially.

== History ==
The history of the Finnish maternity package begins at a time when Finnish maternal-infant mortality rates were remarkably elevated, even for the time period, with deaths being attributed to issues such as starvation, infection, poor sanitation, exposure to the harsh climate, and poverty.

In 1904, the "Drop of Milk Association" (Maitopisarayhdistys in Finnish) offered donated breastmilk to mothers who were not able to breastfeed their babies. To receive the donated breastmilk, mothers were required to bring their baby to regular medical check-ups.

In 1922, relatively soon after Finland gained independence in 1917, a volunteer of the Mannerheim League for Child Welfare (founded by Sophie Mannerheim, a prominent Finnish nurse) by the name of Mrs. Ilmi Hallstén conceived the idea for the baby box. Dr. Arvo Ylppö, an eminent Finnish pediatrician, obtained donated textiles from Germany. Local volunteers sewed baby clothes out of the donated textiles. These clothes were included with linens and hygiene items into "rotating baskets" (kiertokorit in Finnish) and were loaned to local mothers who needed them. After a baby grew out of the clothes, the baskets were returned to the volunteers, who repaired and laundered the contents, then passed them on to the next family.

One year later, 28 chapters of the Mannerheim League for Child Welfare were circulating similar rotating baskets. Five years later, over 180 chapters had sewing circles of volunteer women who were eager to support families in need across Finland. Meeting the need for baby clothing during the 1930's and wartime (1939-45) was a clear and tangible effort that was readily supported.

While the maternity package was valued in the 1930s primarily because many poor Finnish women would otherwise have been unable to afford its contents, nowadays working parents especially appreciate the time saved by not having to buy many things. The maternity package is considered part of Finnish culture. Panu Pulma, Professor of Finnish and Nordic History in Helsinki, describes it as a symbol of equality and the importance of children, and of the fact that children are a priority for the government and taxpayers.

In 1937, the Maternity Grants Act was enacted, which provided mothers with baby clothes and care items. In 1938, the Finnish government began to provide "maternity grants" for low-income mothers in the form of either an in-kind goods "baby box" or an alternative cash benefit. As Finland had recently gained independence in 1917 and the Finnish government lacked monetary funds, providing a "baby box" with in-kind benefits as a possible alternative to cash benefits was practical. In addition, many Finns were in need and the grant in either form was intended to provide some compensation for wages lost during the time of childbirth.

In 1938, two-thirds of new mothers in Finland received a maternity grant, which was valued at more than one-third of an industrial worker's average monthly wages. Initially, municipal social welfare boards assessed eligibility for the grant among mothers in their municipality. However, due to many complaints from mothers who were not deemed eligible, in 1949 parliament approved the amended maternity grant in which 1) the maternity grant became a universal benefit to anyone living in Finland, or those working on Finnish ships (whether citizens or asylum seekers) regardless of income and 2) an expectant mother must have a check-up and receive advice at a doctor, midwife, or municipal healthcare center appointment before receiving the maternity grant. Expanding the knowledge of mothers and families about health during pregnancy and infancy was an important goal of the second condition, in particular.

In 1944, additional legislation was passed and municipalities became responsible for ensuring that maternal and child health clinics were available, free of charge, to all families.

Although other European countries introduced maternal benefits during the world wars to improve the health of mothers and children and thereby increase birth rates, only in Finland did the maternity grant evolve into a permanent, universal, in-kind grant with the unique focus of not only increasing the birth rate, but also of improving public health.

== Modern-day package ==
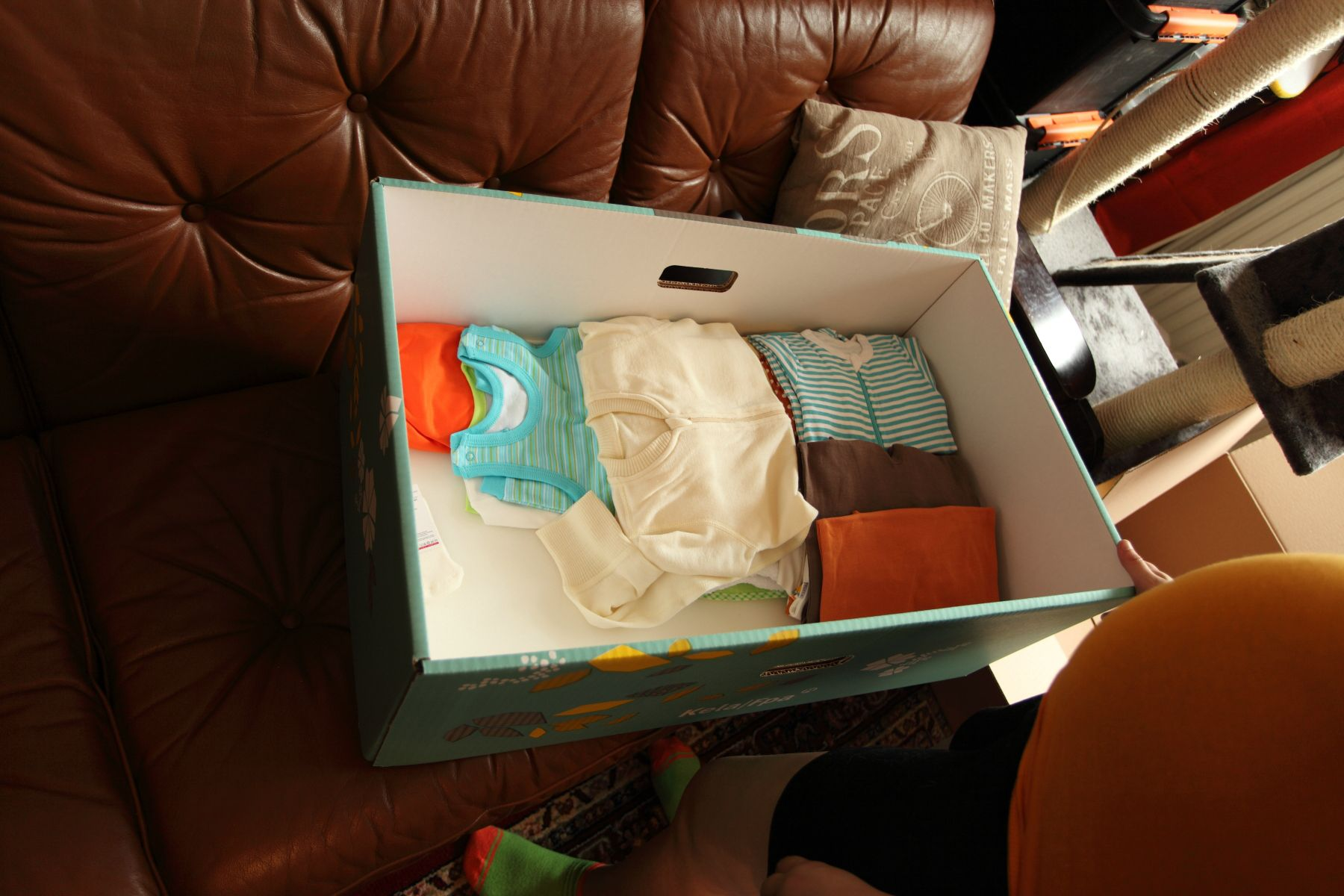
Parts of the maternity package in 2014.

In 1949, the box given was standard to all expectant mothers who visited a doctor before the fourth month of pregnancy per the Finnish Maternity Grants Act. A baby bottle was added to the package, but was removed in later packages to encourage breastfeeding. The requirement to visit a doctor as a prerequisite to receiving the package was done in order to ensure that the woman received adequate prenatal care. The maternity package can either be applied for online, on Kela's website, or by completing and returning a form.

As of 2025, the current package contents include bodysuits, a sleeping bag, outdoor gear, bathing products for the baby, nappies and cream, bedding, a hooded bath towel, nail scissors, hairbrush, toothbrush, wash cloth, muslin squares, a picture book, teething toy, and bra pads. It also contains a small mattress, allowing the box containing the package to become a crib in which many newborns have their first naps. In previous years, condoms have been included by way of precaution, not as a discouragement, as a new pregnancy is possible within a few weeks of childbirth and many parents wish to have a little time between the births of their children.

The maternity package is not a commercial product; as a result Kela cannot sell it. Prince William and Catherine, Duchess of Cambridge received a maternity package as a gift from Kela in 2013. Crown Princess Victoria and Prince Daniel of Sweden were given one in 2012.

=== Contents ===
In 2025, the box contained 38 different products:

==== Bodysuits ====
- 2 × Wrap around bodysuit; 50–56cm
- 2 × Wrap around bodysuit with extender; 62–68cm
- Bodysuit with extender; 62–68cm
- Nightdress; 62-68 cm

==== Trousers ====
- Trousers; 50-56 cm
- 2 × Trousers; 62–68 cm

==== Caps, mittens, and socks ====
- Balaclava hood; 44–46 cm
- Wool cap; 44–48 cm
- Mittens and socks

==== Outerwear ====
- Insulated mittens and booties; 68–74 cm
- Wool-blend coverall; 68–74 cm
- Snowsuit/sleeping bag; 68–74 cm
- Sleeping bag-blanket

==== Bed linen and box ====
- Duvet cover
- Sheet
- 2 × Blanket
- Mattress pad
- Box bed + lid

==== Baby care items ====
- Muslin square
- Feeding bib
- Towel
- Hairbrush
- Bath thermometer
- Nail scissors
- Toothbrush
- Book (available in Finnish, Inari Sami, Skolt Sami, and North Sami)

==== Hygiene products ====
- Sanitary towels
- Nipple cream
- Bra pads
- Condoms (removed in the 2025 box)

== Research ==
International curiosity surrounding the Finnish baby box is often associated with the fact that Finland has one of the lowest infant mortality rates in the world. However, there is no evidence that the baby box has had any effect on infant mortality in Finland. Retrospective studies would be difficult due to design or implement given the lack of records from the historical period in which the baby box was introduced, and a current study would be complicated by the ubiquitous use of the baby box in Finland, today. However, it is possible to analyze new programs in other countries that have been inspired by or are similar to the Finnish baby box program.

A 2020 report from Tampere University, published by Kela, reported that over 60 countries use some form of a baby "box" maternity package. After in-depth interviews with 29 of these 60 programs, researchers found that the baby box concept has been highly adapted to fit many cultures and has been used with the aim to promote various messages, such as safe sleep or breastfeeding, in contexts from rural prisons to capital cities. The report also addressed popular topics surrounding the baby box, such as Sudden Infant Death Syndrome (SIDS), as well as the history of the Finnish baby box and its connection to larger social support systems.

In 2017, an experimental study was conducted in the United States on the use of US baby boxes (a.k.a., "cardboard bassinets"), in combination with safe sleep education, for reducing bed-sharing, which is a risk factor for SIDS and sleep-related deaths (SRD). Researchers at Temple University Hospital assigned study participants (i.e., mother-infant dyads) to one of the following conditions for postpartum hospital discharge: standard hospital discharge instructions; standard instructions plus additional safe infant sleep education based on the AAP safe infant sleep recommendations; or both types of instruction plus a gifted baby box from The Baby Box Company. The researchers concluded that the third condition (i.e., both types of instruction plus a gifted baby box) reduced the rate of bed-sharing during the first week of the infant's life (as self-reported by the participating mothers), particularly for exclusively breastfeeding mother-infant dyads.

Contemporary postpartum care emphasizes not only newborn survival but also parental physical recovery, mental health, breastfeeding support, and family well-being.WHO recommends comprehensive postnatal care covering mothers and newborns during the first six weeks after birth.

== Similar programs in other countries ==
=== Argentina ===
In July 2015, Argentina's Ministry of Health under then-president Cristina Fernandez de Kirchner introduced "Plan Qunita" which distributes maternity packages to parents of newborn babies. At the rollout of the program, about 144,000 Qunitas were issued.

=== Australia ===
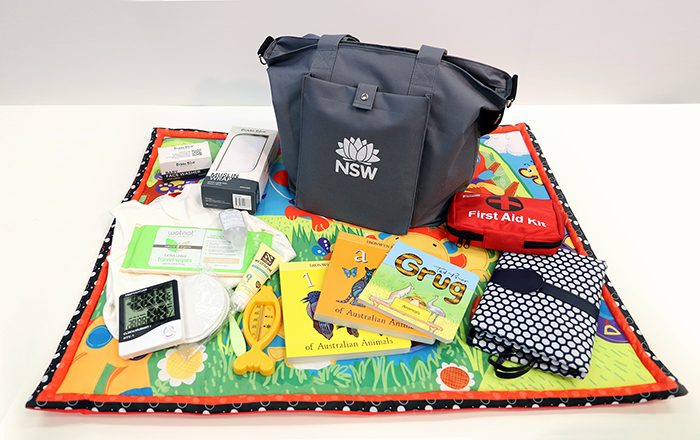
The baby bundle provided to the parents of every baby born in New South Wales

In Australia, the state of New South Wales began a program providing a baby bundle to the parents of every baby born from 1 January 2019. The bundle contains picture books, mats, a first aid kit, a sleeping bag, thermometers, and consumable child-care products such as cloths and wipes, with a total retail value of AU$300.

Similarly, the state of Victoria began a baby bundle program starting from July 2019, for all first-time parents and carers.

=== Canada ===
In 2016, a program modeled on the Finnish baby box concept was launched in the northern territory of Nunavut, as a way of combatting its high infant mortality rate.

=== England ===
The Brighton and Hove City Council voted in 2024 to adopt a baby box programme for 100 newborns, making it the first city in England to adopt the baby box programme. The baby box programme was proposed by councilmembers Bruno De Oliveira and Joy Robinson.

=== Wales ===
The Welsh Labour government of Eluned Morgan launched the Baby Bundle programme in February 2026. Under the programme, new parents in deprived areas under the Flying Start programme are given a free, fully funded "baby bundle" which includes up to 6 months worth of clothing, blankets, bibs and muslin cloths, a thermometer, a playmat, and a bilingual book in the Welsh and English languages, as well as information booklets on parenting advice and parent support programmes. Parents in Flying Start areas are eligible for the programme, with limited places also offered to parents in need who live in the rest of the country.

=== Ireland ===
A similar scheme has been proposed in Ireland. The program will be piloted starting February 2023 with 500 Little Baby Bundles that will be delivered to expectant parents completing a form at the pilot hospitals of Rotunda Hospital in Dublin and University Hospital Waterford following their 20-week scan. The pilot bundle has an estimated value of €300.

=== Scotland ===
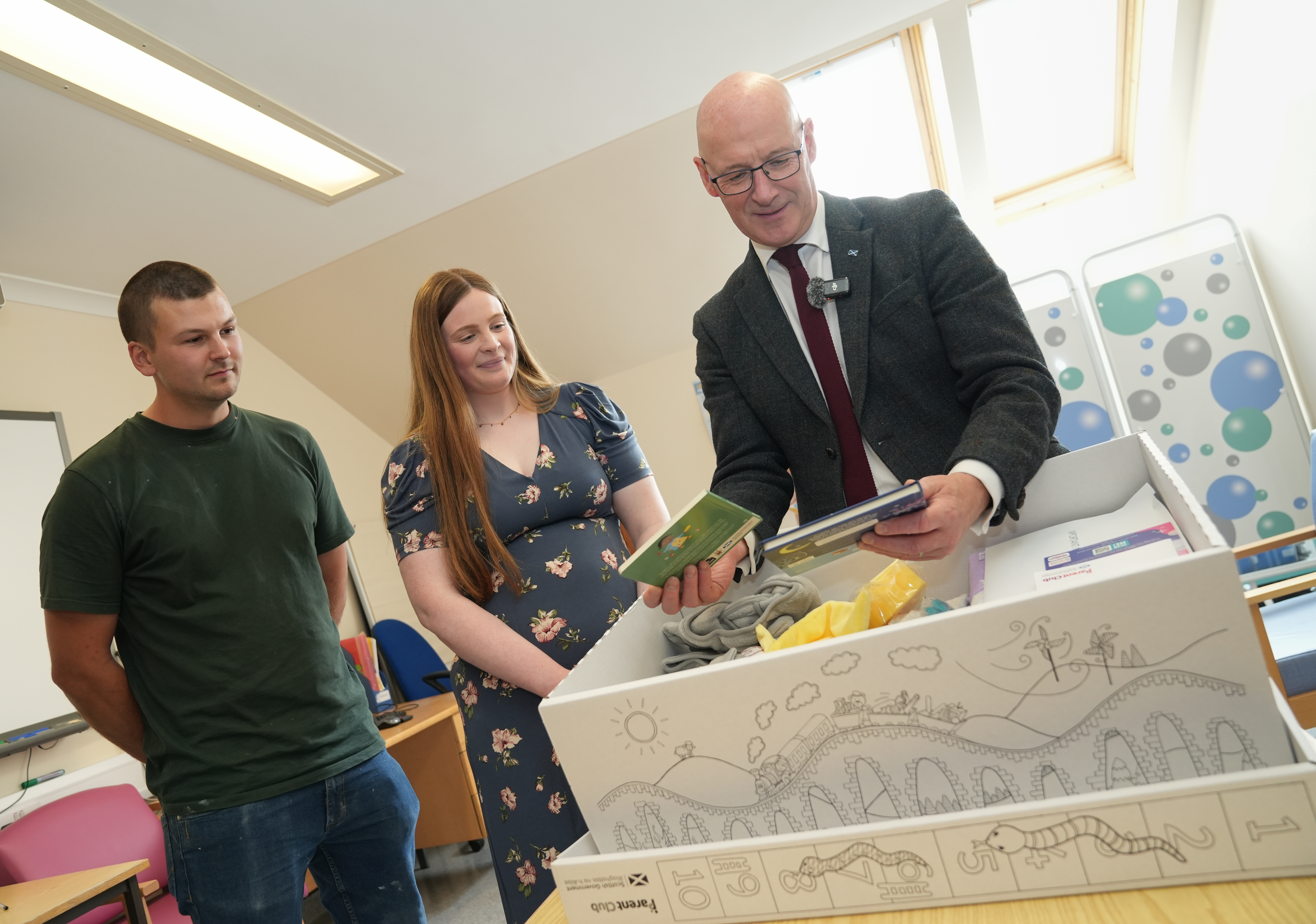
John Swinney, the First Minister of Scotland, presenting a baby box to an expectant couple

A similar scheme was introduced in Scotland in 2017 by Nicola Sturgeon. After a three-month pilot scheme in Clackmannanshire and Orkney, the Scottish "baby box" began to be issued to all parents with newborns in summer 2017, with over 52,000 such boxes issued in the first twelve months of the programme. By 2025, the total distribution had grown to over 350,000 boxes with each box valued around £400. In January 2026, the Scottish Government sent a baby box to Zohran Mamdani as a gesture of goodwill and as a leading example for his proposed baby box program.

=== Sweden ===
In Sweden, startboxes are offered by some stores that sell baby products as well as pharmacies and some hospitals. Many new parents actually benefit from multiple boxes from companies trying to win new customers.

=== Ukraine ===
In Ukraine, the state baby box program has been launched since 2018. It includes approximately 90 items, primarily Ukrainian-made. Women can receive the box after 36 weeks of pregnancy.

=== United States ===
In the summer of 2017, it was announced that the U.S. state of New Jersey would become the first state in the country to adopt the baby box program. However, the program has been subsequently shut down. In 2021, the United States Consumer Product Safety Commission banned the sales of baby boxes, along with incline sleepers, in-bed sleepers, small stand-less bassinets, and sleep hammocks.

During his campaign for Mayor of New York City, Zohran Mamdani proposed giving all new New York City families "baby baskets" containing products such as diapers and nursing supplies.

== See also ==
- Layette, a collection of infant clothing prepared (made, bought, or given) during pregnancy
