= Elli Ruuth =

Finnish architect (1883-1975)

- Born: 1893
- Died: 1975 (aged 81–82)
- Occupation: Architect
- Buildings: Finnish embassy in Moscow

Elli Ruuth (1893 – 1975) was a Finnish furniture architect. She was active in 1924 – 1952.

== Works ==
Ruuth designed furniture for various state and municipal buildings. According to Architecta, the Finnish association of women architects, her "most brilliant" works were the interiors of the Finnish embassy in Moscow and Villa Baumgartner in Helsinki.

== Finnish Association of Women Architects ==
In 1919, Elli Ruuth together with Elsa Arokallio, Elsi Borg, Salme Setälä, Eva Kuhlefeld and Aili-Salli Ahde-Kjäldman, was part of the founding group of the Tumstocken association and then the Finnish Association of Women Architects.
