= Sophie Mannerheim School =

Primary and hospital school in Finland

Sophie Mannerheim School Sophie Mannerheimin koulu

Location
- Sibeliuksenkatu 14, Taka-Töölö, Helsinki; Finland
- Coordinates: 60.1793933°N 24.9169147°E

Information
- Type: Primary, Hospital
- Established: 2011
- Principal: Marja-Liisa Autio
- Grades: Lower and upper primary (grades 1–9)
- Gender: Mixed
- Language: Finnish
- Website: Official website

Sophie Mannerheim School (Finnish: Sophie Mannerheimin koulu; formerly Aurora School, Finnish: Auroran koulu) is a primary and hospital school located in the Taka-Töölö district in Helsinki, Finland. The school has grades 1–9, and it has the special mission of hospital teaching to teach elementary school-aged children who are hospitalized at HYKS. The school is named after Sophie Mannerheim (1863–1928), a baroness nurse who founded the Children's Castle, among other things.

As of 2019, the school operates in mobile modular buildings in front of the HYKS Psychiatry Center. In addition, the school has branch office on the Stenbäckinkatu street near the New Children's Hospital. As of 2023 planning is ongoing for a move of the school to Laakso, where a new hospital is expected to house a children's ward starting from 2028.

== See also ==
- Helsinki University Central Hospital
- Mannerheim League for Child Welfare
