= Ylppö =

Ylppö may refer to:

- Arvo Ylppö, Finnish pediatrician
- 2846 Ylppö, asteroid
