= Battle of Ristilahti =

Russo-Swedish battle

Battle of Ristalahti
- Part of the Ingrian War
Date	27 July 1614
Location	Ristilahti, Uukuniemi
Result	Swedish victory
Territorial changes	Sweden consolidates control of Kexholm

Belligerents
(yes) Swedish Empire	Tsardom of Russia

Commanders and leaders
(Swedish Empire) Hans Munck (WIA) (Swedish Empire) Hans Stålhandske	Unknown

Strength
Unknown, but less than the Russians	750 men

Casualties and losses
Unknown	Unknown

The battle of Ristilahti occurred on 27 July 1614 during the Ingrian War. The Swedish troops, under Hans Munck and Hans Stålhandske managed to rout the Russian troops, consolidating Sweden's grip on Kexholm county.

== Background ==
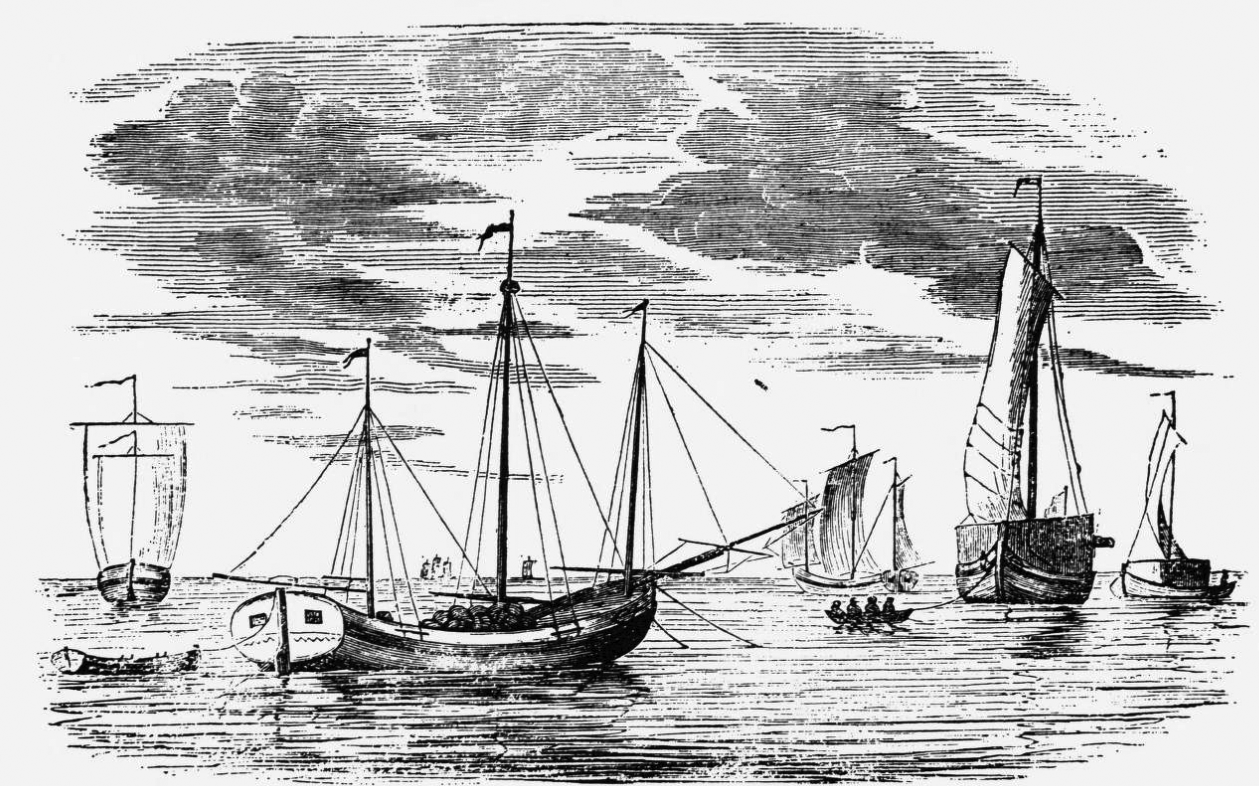
Depiction of Russian lodja boats conducting fish purchases in Finnmark in 1845

During the Ingrian War, skirmishes between Swedish and Russian ships regularly took place in the Lake Ladoga region. On 19 May 1614, an engagement occurred where 11 Swedish lodja vessels defeated a Russian squadron, capturing three lodja in the process.

Soon after, Hans Munck, who was the commander of Kexholm County, was forced to confront a large Russian landing into Swedish territory. The Russian force, which consisted of some 750 men, crossed Lake Ladoga by lodja. As they landed, Munck confronted them, managing to push them back to their boats, with the Russians suffering 30 killed and 15 captured in the process.

== Battle ==
After they were repelled, the Russians noticed that they outnumbered the Swedes, who were lesser than they thought, and thus made another attempt to land. The battle happened on 27 July 1614 at Ristalahti in Uukuniemi. Munck waited for the Russians on the open field from a distance from the Russian landing, and instead of attacking, the Russians dug themselves in on the shore. Then, Munck led a charge but was wounded, with his second in command Hans Stålhandske managing to rout the Russians. The Russian defeat was so severe that a Russian delegation from Aunus arrived in order to request peace, with the entire Lake Ladoga region remaining in Swedish control.

== Aftermath ==
The Swedish victory at Ristilahti led to the consolidation of Sweden's grip on Kexholm.

=== Memorial ===
In remembrance of the battle, a monument designed by Elsi Borg was erected on August 22 1937. It has four bas-reliefs created by Lauri Leppänen on the front, with the reliefs depicting Munck arriving with the garrison from Savonlinna in order to repel the Russians from their positions on the eastern shore of Lake Ladoga in Uukeniemi, the Russians in their positions, peasant soldiers joining the fight against the Russians, and the Russians retreating to their boats after the battle.

== Works cited ==
- Essen, Michael Fredholm von (2024). Sweden's War in Muscovy, 1609-1617: The Relief of Moscow and Conquest of Novgorod. Helion & Company. ISBN 9781804510087.
- Roberts, Michael (1953). Gustavus Adolphus: A History of Sweden 1611-1632. Vol. 1. London: Longman.
