= Elsa Arokallio =

Finnish architect

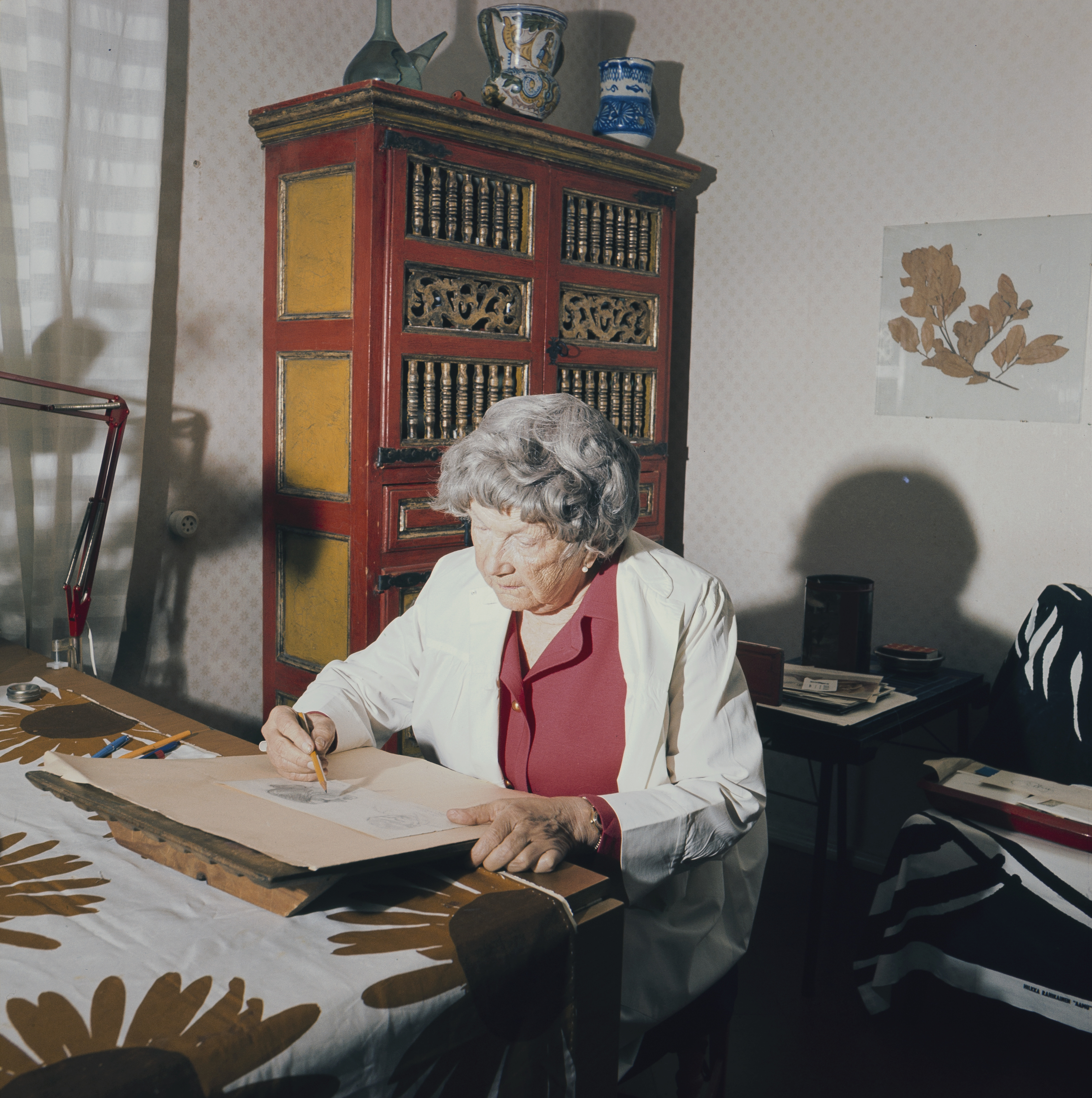
Elsa Arokallio

Elsa Arokallio (18 August 1892, Kurkijoki – 3 October 1982, Helsinki) was a Finnish architect.

She was born in 1892 to Gustaf Arokallio and Elisabeth Parviainen. She graduated in 1910 and obtained her degree in architecture in 1919 from Helsinki University of Technology. She created an architecture firm with her husband, Erkki Väänänen. After four years of marriage he died, and Arokallio ran the firm herself. She also worked for the Ministry of Defence and helped design the barracks in Kauhava which were completed in 1933, and coastal artillery headquarters in Lahdenpohja, which were completed in 1933. In the 1930s she also worked with Elsi Borg.

In 1940 Arokallio moved to Viborg where she worked with Martha Martikainen-Ypyä. After World War II she worked in Lahti with architect Könönen and designed single-family houses. She went on to work at Finland's Building Board from 1953 to 1959, building schools in Kokkola, Jakobstad, Tampere and Varkaus. She also began to work in interior design.
