= Töölö Church =

Coordinates: 60°10′47″N 024°55′16″E

Töölö church
- Finnish: Töölön kirkko Swedish: Tölö kyrka
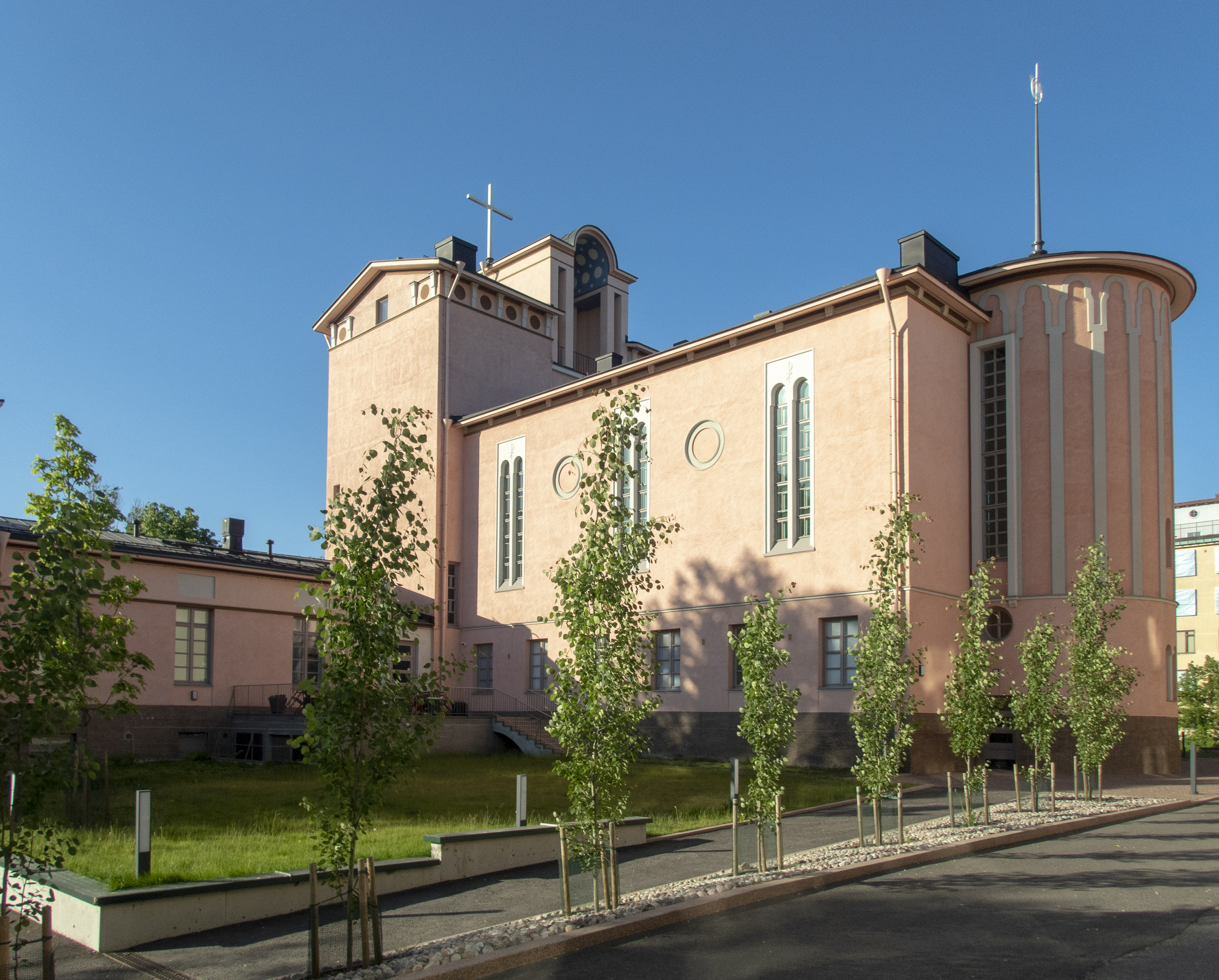
- Töölö Church
- Töölö church
- Location: Taka-Töölö, Helsinki
- Country: Finland
- Denomination: Lutheran

History
- Status: active

Architecture
- Architect: Hilding Ekelund
- Completed: 1930

Specifications
- Capacity: 500

Administration
- Diocese: Helsinki diocese
- Parish: Töölö

Töölö Church (Finnish: Töölön kirkko, Swedish: Tölö kyrka) is a Lutheran church in the Taka-Töölö district of Helsinki, Finland. The building represents Nordic Classicism and was designed by Hilding Ekelund following an architectural competition. Completed in 1930, it originally served as a parish center and was dedicated as a church when Töölö parish was created in 1941.

The church main hall seats 400 people. There are also two parish meeting halls for 70 and 20 people.

Töölö Church reopened in early 2016 after three and a half years of renovations.

== Artwork ==
Töölö Church contains many pieces of art, including:

- Relief Heavenly Feast and gilded wood sculpture Resurrected Christ by Gunnar Finne
- Glass paintings by Gunnar Forsström
- Wall painting by Paavo Leinonen
- Reliefs of apostles Peter, Paul, Andrew, and Thomas by Carl Wilhelms
- Partial sketch on altar wall by Henry Ericsson – Ericsson was commissioned to paint the altar wall but died in a car accident before completing the work

== See also ==
- Temppeliaukio Church – a popular church in the neighboring Etu-Töölö, also part of Töölö parish
- Kunsthalle Helsinki – an art exhibition venue also designed by Hilding Ekelund
