= Kunsthalle Helsinki =

Art exhibition venue in Helsinki, Finland

Coordinates: 60°10′19.4″N 24°55′52″E

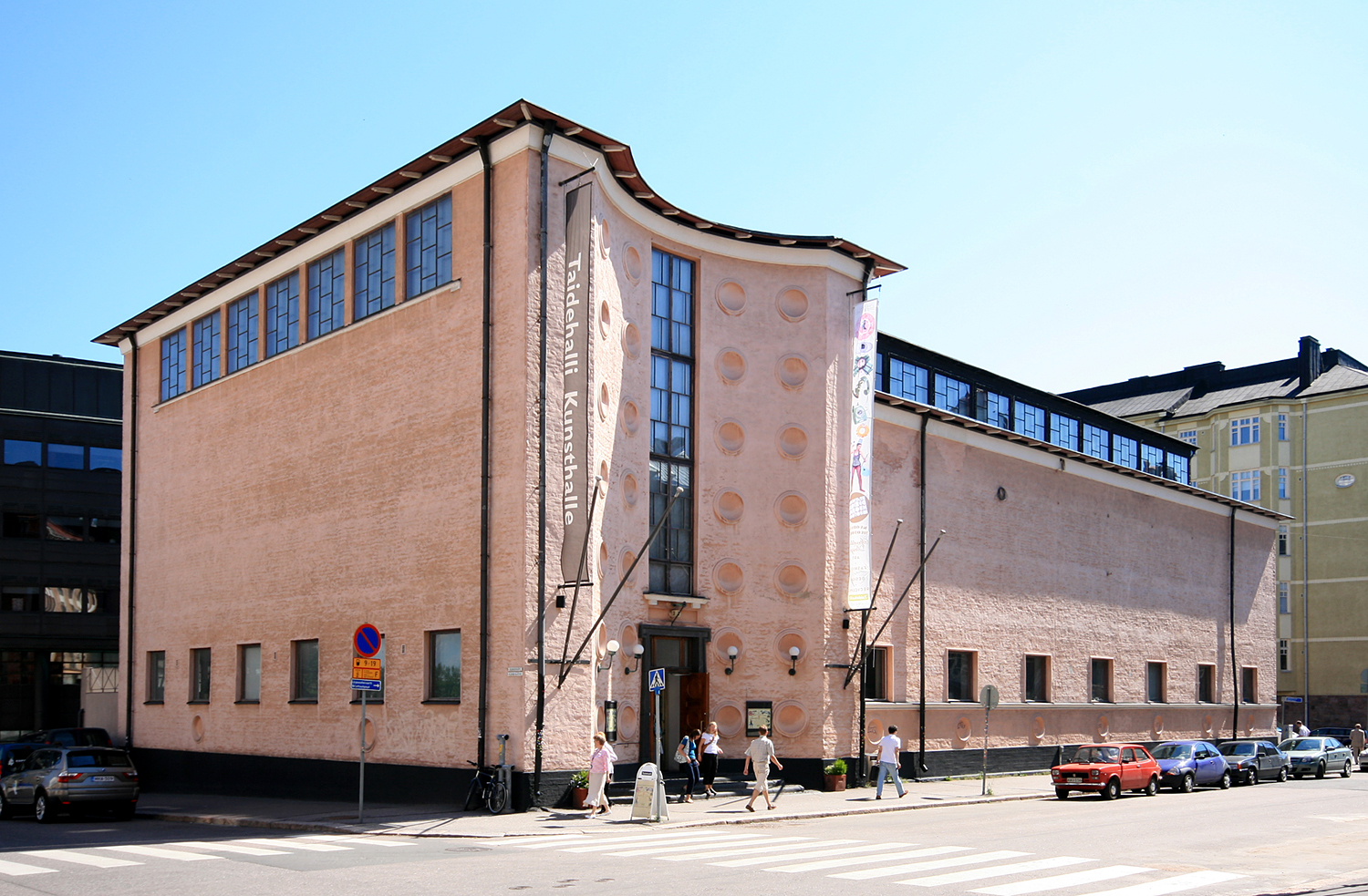
Kunsthalle Helsinki

Kunsthalle Helsinki (Finnish: Helsingin Taidehalli, Swedish: Helsingfors Konsthall) is a non-profit exhibition space founded by various Finnish artist and art associations in 1928. Presenting annually 5–7 major exhibitions and special events, the main focus of the exhibition programme lies in contemporary art, as well as design and architecture. The Kunsthalle has been a central place for changing exhibitions since the beginning, and does not hold a permanent collection.

The Kunsthalle building was designed by Hilding Ekelund and Jarl Eklund. Completed in 1928, the building is a prime example of Nordic Classicism in Finland. The building has been renovated several times and the latest major refurbishment was completed in 2009.

== See also ==
- Kunsthalle
- Töölö Church
