= Taulumäki Church =

Church building in Jyväskylä, Finland

Coordinates: 62°15′12″N 025°45′05″E

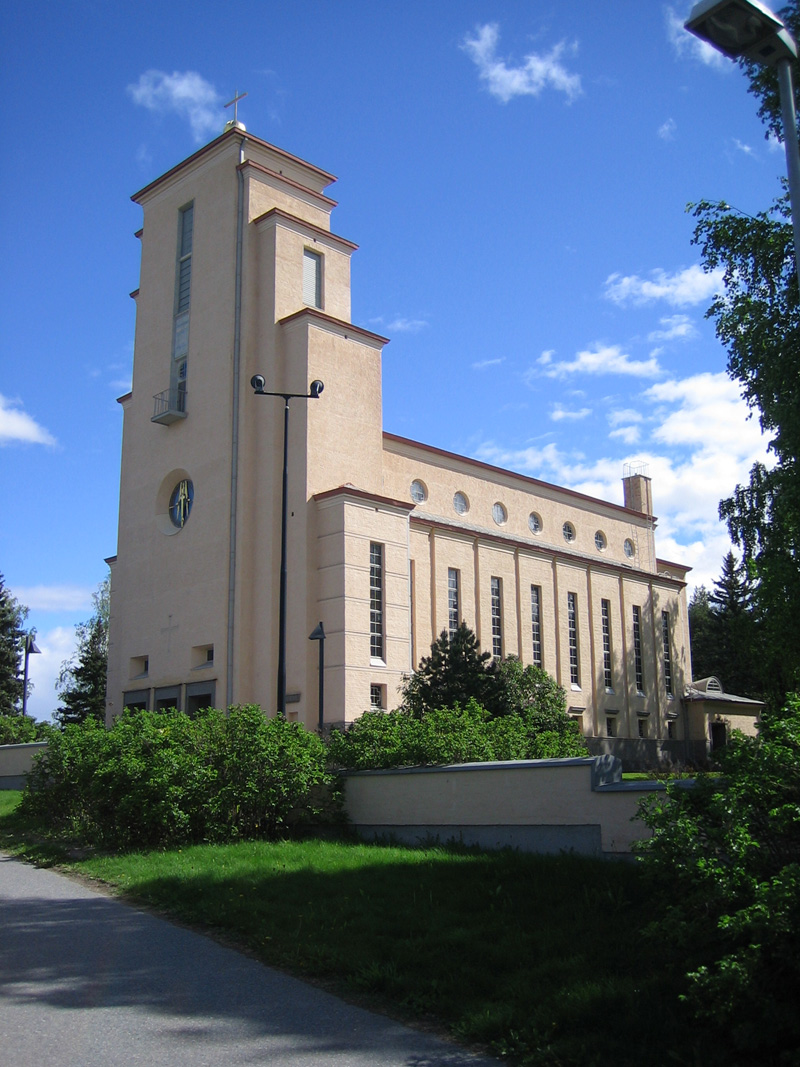
Taulumäki Church in Jyväskylä, Finland

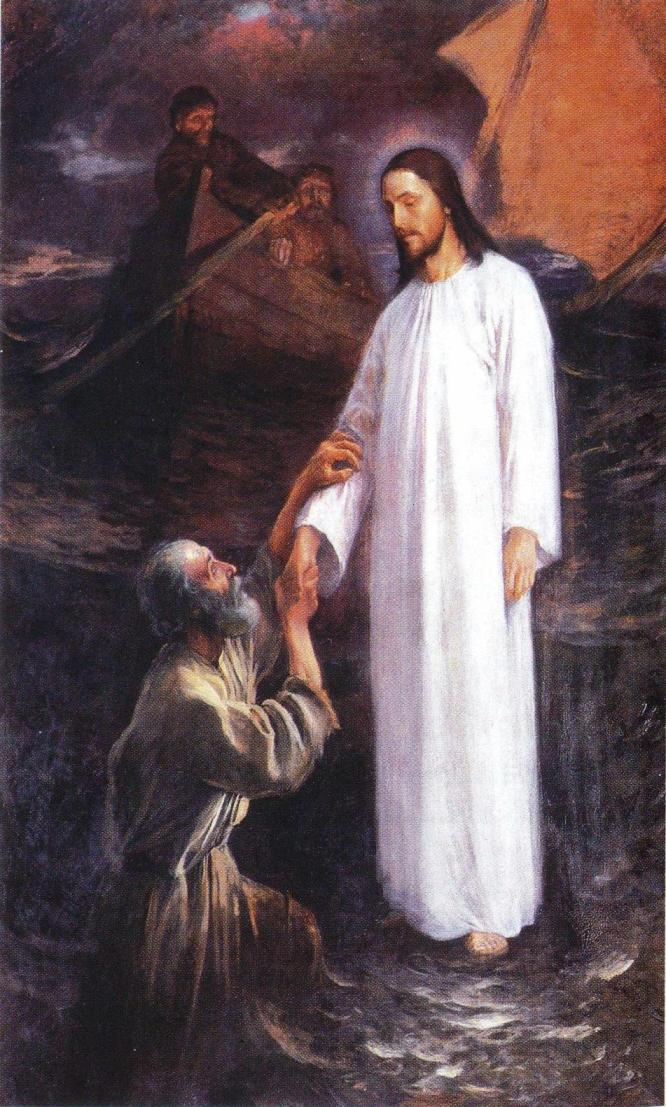
Eero Järnefelt: Peter on the water

Taulumäki Church (Finnish: Taulumäen kirkko) is the principal Lutheran church in Jyväskylä, the administrative centre of the Central Finland region. Designed by architect Elsi Borg (1893–1958), its construction began in 1928. The church was inaugurated on October 27, 1929, and replaces the 1885 church designed by Ludvig Isak Lindqvist, which had burned down on January 27, 1918.

The church has frescoes on Biblical themes – Lapsi on meille syntynyt ("To us a child is born", Isaiah 9:6) and Se on täytetty ("It is finished," John 19:30) – painted by Paavo Leinonen. Leinonen also decorated the pulpit and made other interior paintings as well.

The altarpiece of the church, painted by Eero Järnefelt and rescued from the fire that destroyed the previous church, features Pietari käy yli veden ("Peter on the water") and below it Jonas Heiska's painting Kristus ja lampaita ("Christ and the sheep.")

The original church roof, gutters and window frames were replaced during a renovation in the summer of 2007. A cemetery to the south of the church dates to 1838 and was extended in 1899, 1924 and 1941.
