= Hilding Ekelund =

Finnish architect

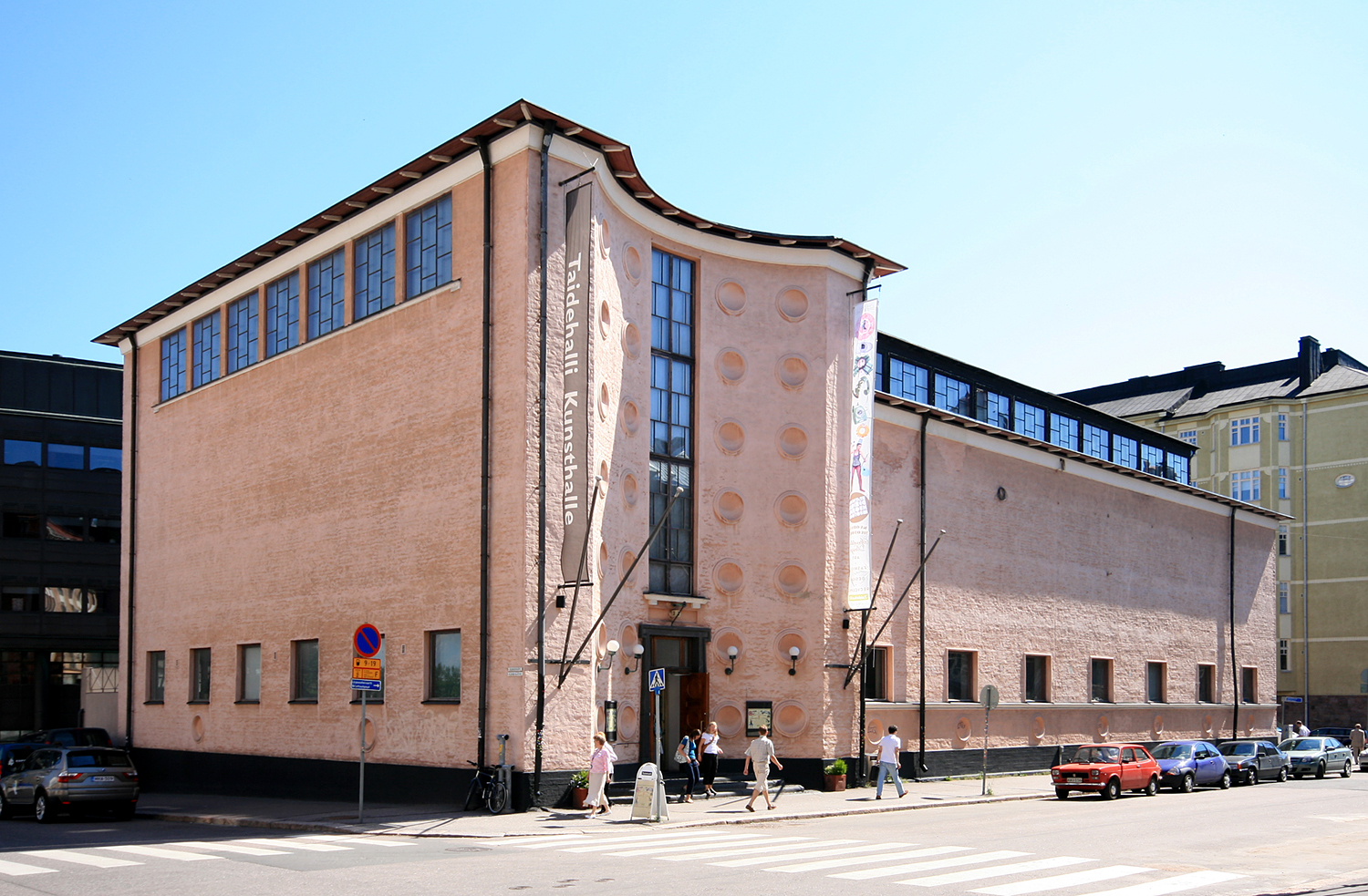
- Taidehalli Art Gallery, Helsinki (1928).
- Born: 18 November 1893; Kangasniemi, Finland
- Died: 30 January 1984 (aged 90); Helsinki, Finland
- Occupation: Architect
- Buildings: Taidehalli Arts Gallery; Maunula social housing Helsinki 1952 Olympic Games village

Georg Hilding Ekelund (18 November 1893 in Kangasniemi – 30 January 1984 in Helsinki) was a Finnish architect, from 1950 to 1958 a professor of housing design at Helsinki University of Technology and from 1931 to 1934 editor-in-chief of the Finnish architects' journal Arkkitehti (Finnish Architectural Review). His career as an architect spans the change in styles in Finland from the Nordic Classicism of the 1920s to the Modernism of the 1970s.

== Career ==
Ekeleund studied architecture at Helsinki University of Technology, qualifying as an architect in 1916. His wide career in architecture spanned from the design of public housing areas and town planning to public buildings, factories and churches. Following a classical education in architecture, where the predominant style was Nordic Classicism, Ekelund like others Finnish architects of his generation, such as Alvar Aalto, made the switch to Modernism – known in Finland as "Functionalism" – partly in response to the greater urbanisation of the country during the 1920s and 1930s.

Ekelund designed a significant number of buildings in the town of Karis, already during the 1930s. The town plan for Karis, drawn up in the 1930s by architect Carolus Lindberg was soon regarded as over-dimensioned, and Ekelund was given the task of redesigning it. His "modern" design was influenced by ideas from the Garden city movement, as interpreted in Finland by Otto-Iivari Meurman and its modern interpretation by Le Corbusier, with a particular emphasis on open spaces and parks. In the town Ekelund designed a dispensing chemist, the town hall, cemetery chapel, water tower, trade college and several schools and old-people's homes.

Architectural competitions have been a common method in Finland for choosing designs for key public buildings, and Ekelund entered several of them over the length of his career. For instance, he won the competition for the choice of the site of the Finnish Parliament building - though the final site was later changed and J.S. Sirén was chosen as the final architect of the building, following a second competition. Among Ekelund's more notable buildings are the Taidehalli Art Gallery (together with Jarl Eklund) in Helsinki, Töölö Church in Helsinki, the Finnish Embassy in Moscow, and a number of buildings for the 1952 Summer Olympics held in Helsinki, including the Olympic Rowing Stadium, the Olympic Velodrome, and the Olympic Games village.

Hilding Ekelund's brother was the author and painter Ragnar Ekelund. His wife, Eva Kuhlefelt-Ekelund, was also an architect, and they formed a joint office in 1927.

== Major works by Hilding Ekelund ==
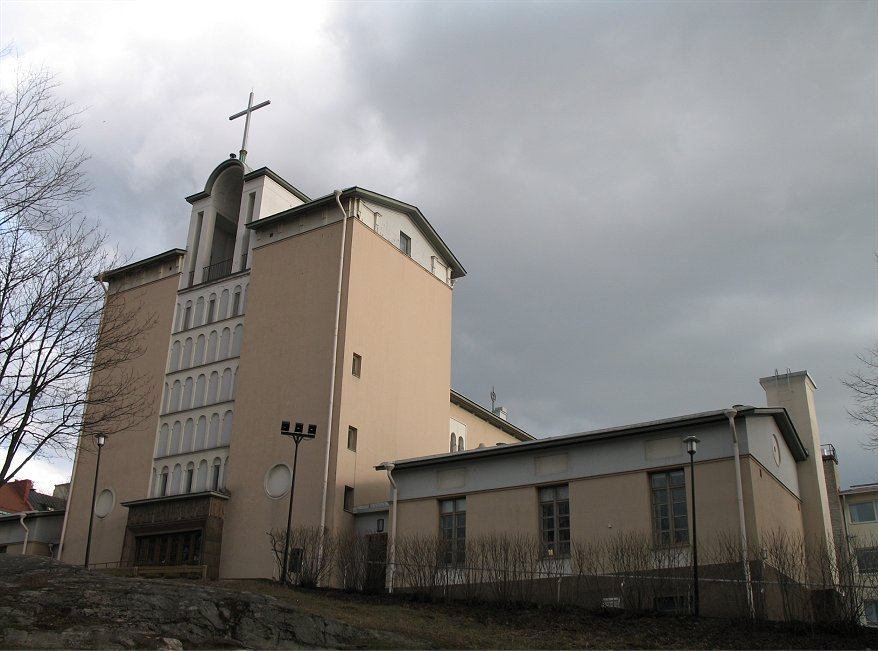
Töölö Church, Helsinki

- Kunsthalle Helsinki (1928), Helsinki
- Töölö Church (1930), Helsinki
- Lutheran Church (1931), Helsinki
- Finnish Embassy in the Soviet Union (1938), Moscow
- Olympic Velodrome (1938–40), Helsinki
- Olympic Village (1939–40), Helsinki
- Helsinki street kiosks (1940s–50s), Helsinki
- Karis water tower (1949–1951), Karis
- Maunula social housing: terraced housing and apartment blocks (1953), Helsinki
- Salmisaari power station (1951), Helsinki
- Swedish-speaking Finnish teachers’ house, Roihuvuori (c. 1957), Helsinki
- Nelimarkka Museum (1964), Alajärvi
- Sahanmäki area regional planning, Maunula, Helsinki

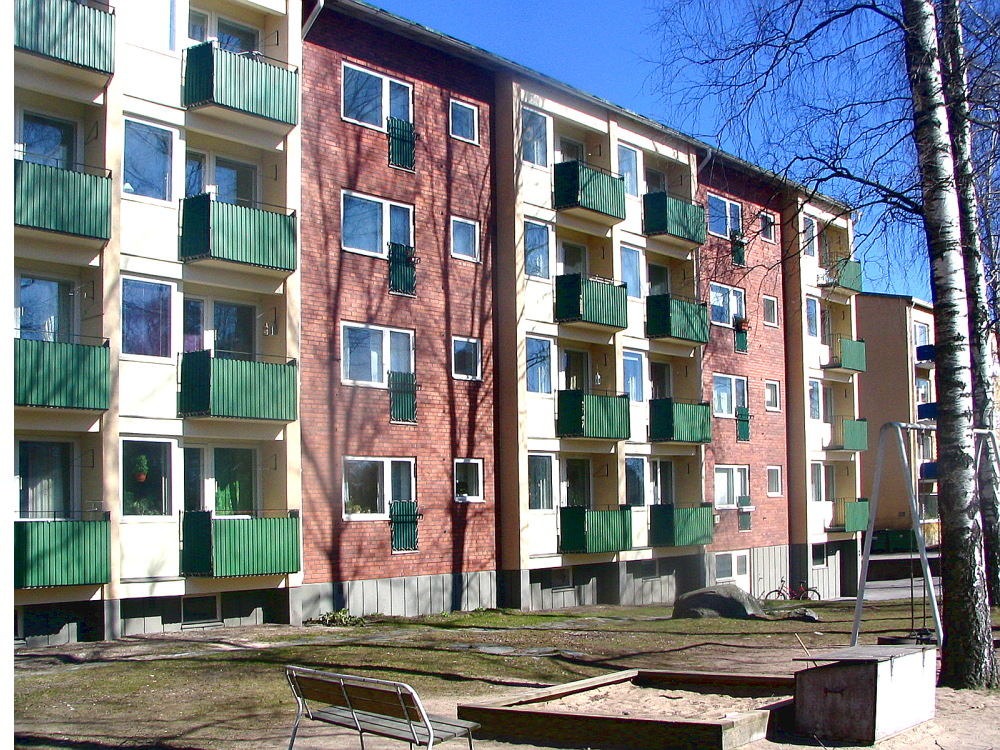
Punahilkantie 12. Roihuvuori housing area, Helsinki

- Private residential building (1969), South-Haaga, Helsinki
