= Archiater =

Title of honor, chief physician of a monarch

An archiater (Ancient Greek: ἀρχίατρος) was a chief physician of a monarch, who typically retained several. At the Roman imperial court, their chief held the high rank and specific title of Comes archiatrorum.

The term has also been used of chief physicians in communities. The word is formed of the Greek ἀρχή Archè, 'chief', and ἴατρος Iatros, a physician; the Latin equivalents are principium and medicus.

In modern Greece, Archiater (Αρχίατρος) is used as an officer rank for army doctors, equivalent to Lieutenant Colonel.

In Finland, arkkiatri is the highest honorary title awarded to a physician by the President of Finland, such that there is only one archiater at a time. The most famous archiater in Finland has been Arvo Ylppö, who pioneered pediatrics in the country and is credited for the enormous reduction of infant mortality to the modern, very low levels. In 2026, oncologist Dr Päivi Hietanen became the first woman to be appointed arkkiatri.

In neighbouring Sweden, the title of archiater was bestowed on the great botanist Carl Linnaeus as an honour.

In Vatican City, the Pope's personal physician retains the historical title of archiater.

== See also ==
- City physician – historical city-appointed physician
