= Children's Castle =

Children's hospital in Helsinki, Finland

- Helsinki University Central Hospital
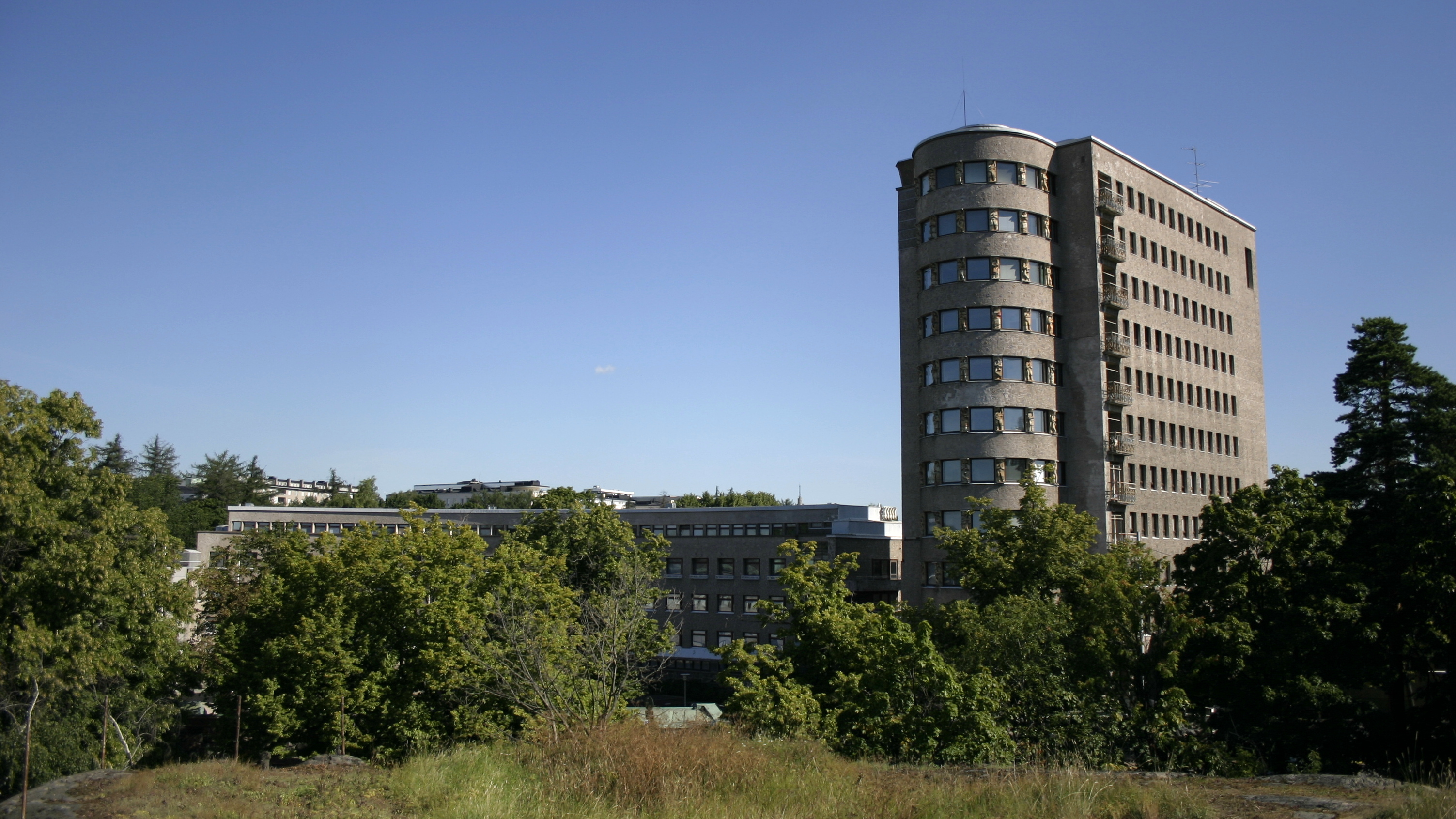

Geography
- Location: Helsinki, Finland
- Coordinates: 60°11′8″N 24°54′36″E

Organisation
- Type: Specialist
- Affiliated university: University of Helsinki

Services
- Emergency department: No
- Beds: 61
- Speciality: Children's hospital

History
- Opened: 1917
- Closed: 2018

Links
- Website: http://www.hus.fi/default.asp?path=59,403,5831,6172,6014
- Lists: Hospitals in Finland

Children's Castle (Lastenlinna) is a former children's hospital in Helsinki, Finland. It was part of Helsinki University Central Hospital.

The hospital was established in 1918 in the Kallio district of Helsinki. The building was designed by the Finnish architect Elsi Borg. Its current building in Taka-Töölö was completed in 1948.

Pediatrician Arvo Ylppö was the hospital chief of Children's Castle from 1920 to 1963, as was Terttu Arajärvi from 1973 to 1985.

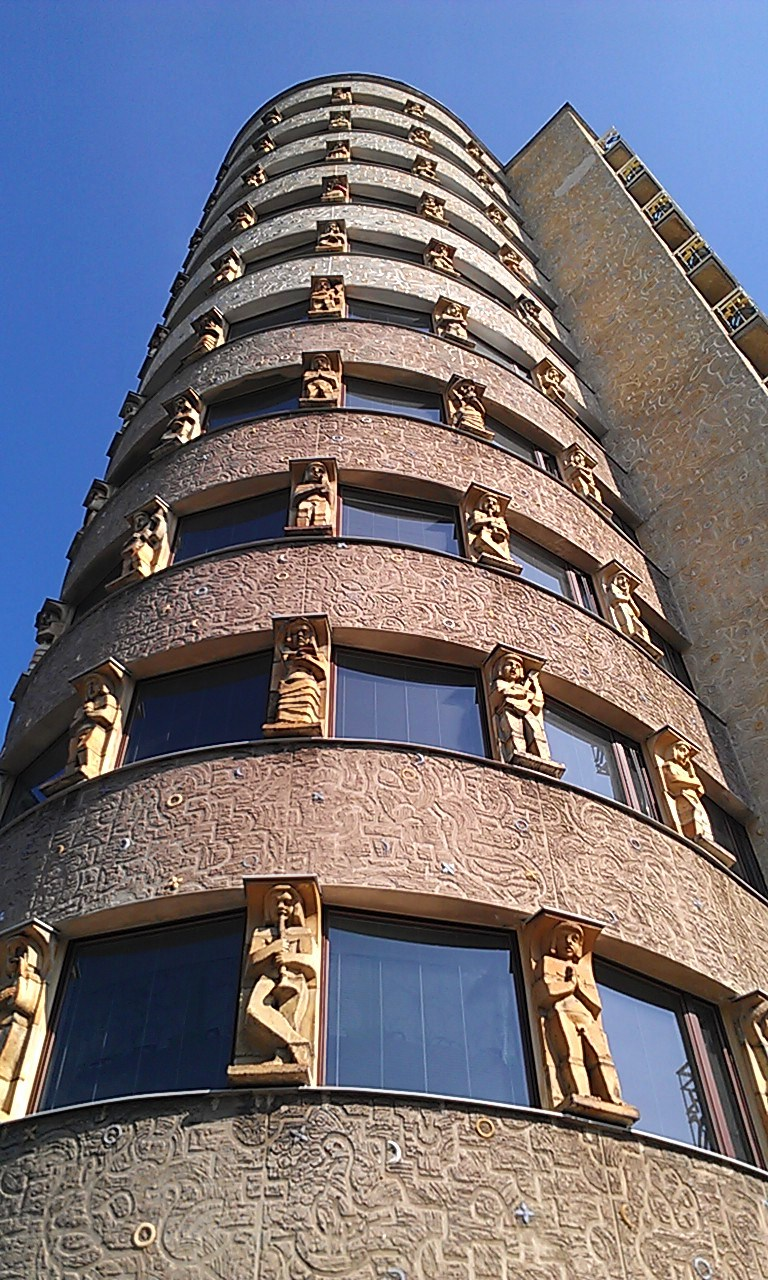
Detail of the Children's Castle

The hospital was discontinued in 2018 when the New Children's Hospital was opened.

== See also ==
- Mannerheim League for Child Welfare
