= Eva Kuhlefelt-Ekelund =

Eva Kuhlefelt-Ekelund (5 September 1892 – 7 August 1984) was a pioneering Finnish woman architect and spouse of another famous Finnish architect, Hilding Ekelund.

Eva Kuhlefelt-Ekelund was born in Loviisa, Finland, and matriculated from the Helsinki New Swedish secondary school in 1910. After that she studied in Helsinki University of Technology and graduated as an architect in 1916. Later she also received state grant and studied in Stockholm, Sweden, from 1919 to 1921. She made study trips to Scandinavian countries as well as to Italy and France. Kuhlefelt-Ekelund also collaborated with another architect, Elsi Borg, and mapped and documented with her Swedish manors and castles. In 1920 Eva Kuhlefelt married architect Hilding Ekelund and chose her two-part surname, Kuhlefelt-Ekelund. The couple also founded their own architect office in Helsinki in 1927. The couple started a fund in their names in 1984. She died in Helsinki in 1984.

== Some well-known designs ==
Kuhlefelt-Ekelund designed Privata svenska flickskolan ('Private Swedish girls' school') in Apollonkatu in Helsinki, which was completed in 1929. The building represented Nordic Classicism. She also designed the monumental Loviisa war cemetery in 1920 and retirement homes in Loviisa and Käpylä, Helsinki.
