= Elsi Borg =

Finnish architect

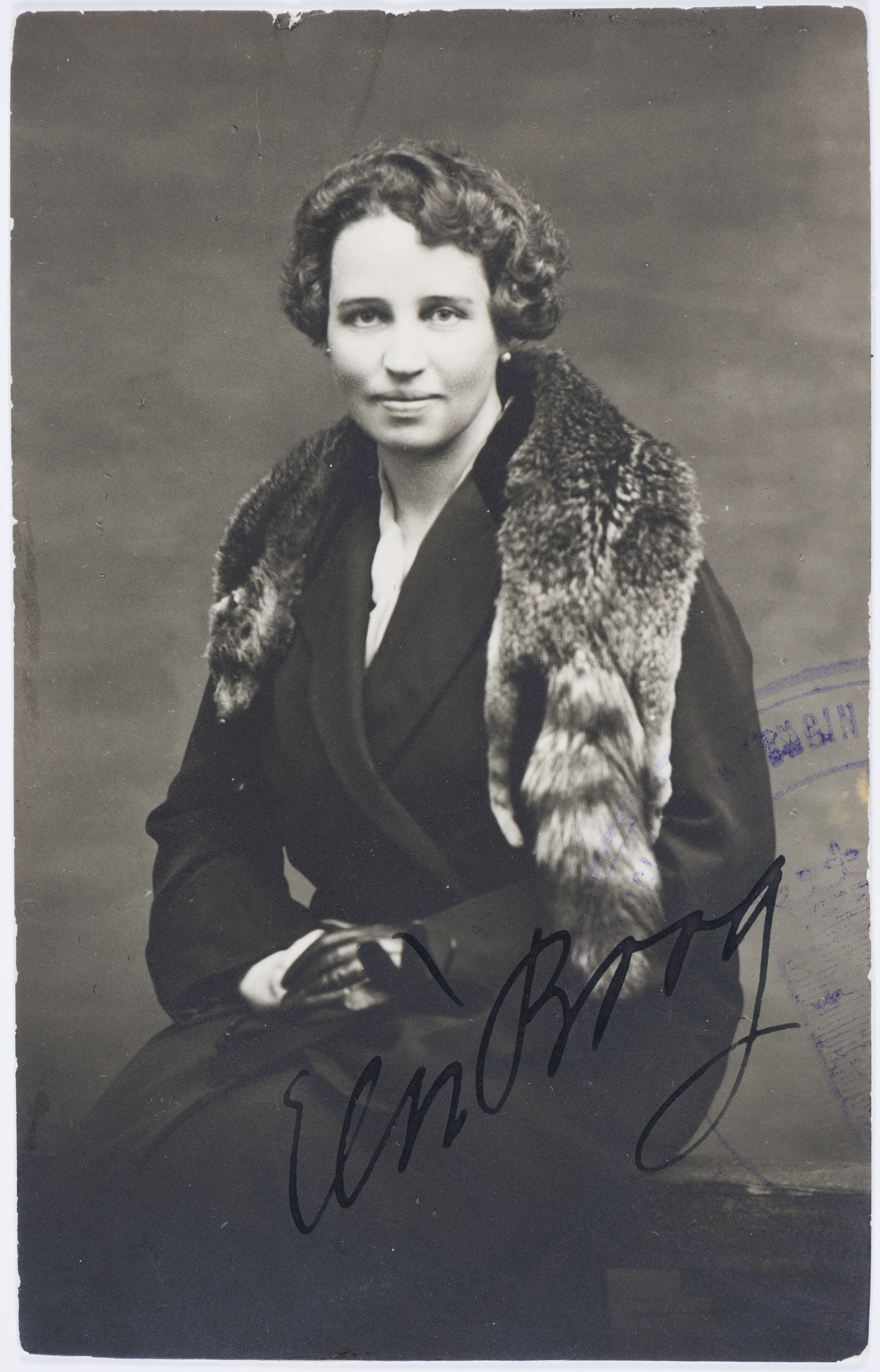
Elsi Borg.

Elsi Naemi Borg (October 3, 1893 – December 30, 1958) was a Finnish architect.

== Life ==
She was born in Nastola and died in Helsinki. She graduated from Helsinki University of Technology in 1919.

Following the death of her brother, architect Kaarlo Borg, in 1939, Borg took over the design of Lastenlinna Children's Hospital in Helsinki, working with Otto Flodin and Olavi Sortta to complete the project in 1948. Borg later designed the hospital's 1958 extension. The building is included in DOCOMOMO Finland's registered selection of important modernist sites.

She also designed the Taulumäki Church in Jyväskylä.

She worked with Olavi Sortta to design the military hospital in Viborg. She is also the sister of graphic artist Esther Borg and Parliament member Margit Borg-Sundman.

In 1919, Elli Ruuth together with Elsa Arokallio, Elsi Borg, Salme Setälä, Eva Kuhlefeld and Aili-Salli Ahde-Kjäldman, was part of the founding group of the Tumstocken association and then the Finnish Association of Women Architects.

== Sources ==
- Henttonen, Maarit: Elsi Borg, 1893–1958, arkkitehti. Suomen Rakennustaiteen Museo, 1995. ISBN 978-951-9229-87-4
- “BLF.” Accessed October 26, 2021. https://www.blf.fi/artikel.php?id=7791.
- “Taulumäki Church · Finnish Architecture Navigator.” Accessed October 26, 2021. https://finnisharchitecture.fi/taulumaki-church/.
- Tyvelä, Hanna. “Sukupuolittuneita Näkymiä = Gendered Perspectives on Architectural Practice.” Arkkitehti 116, no. 2 (January 1, 2019): 41–45.
