= Gustaf Arokallio =

Finnish politician

Gustaf Arokallio (10 June 1854 - 11 December 1939: surname until 1906 Petterson) was a Finnish Lutheran clergyman and politician, born in Sotkamo. He was a member of the Diet of Finland in 1894 and from 1904 to 1905 and of the Parliament of Finland from 1907 to 1909 and from 1910 to 1919. He represented the Young Finnish Party until 1918 and the National Coalition Party from 1918 to 1919.
