= Arvo Ylppö =

Finnish physician, professor and archiater (1887–1992)

Arkkiatri Arvo Ylppö
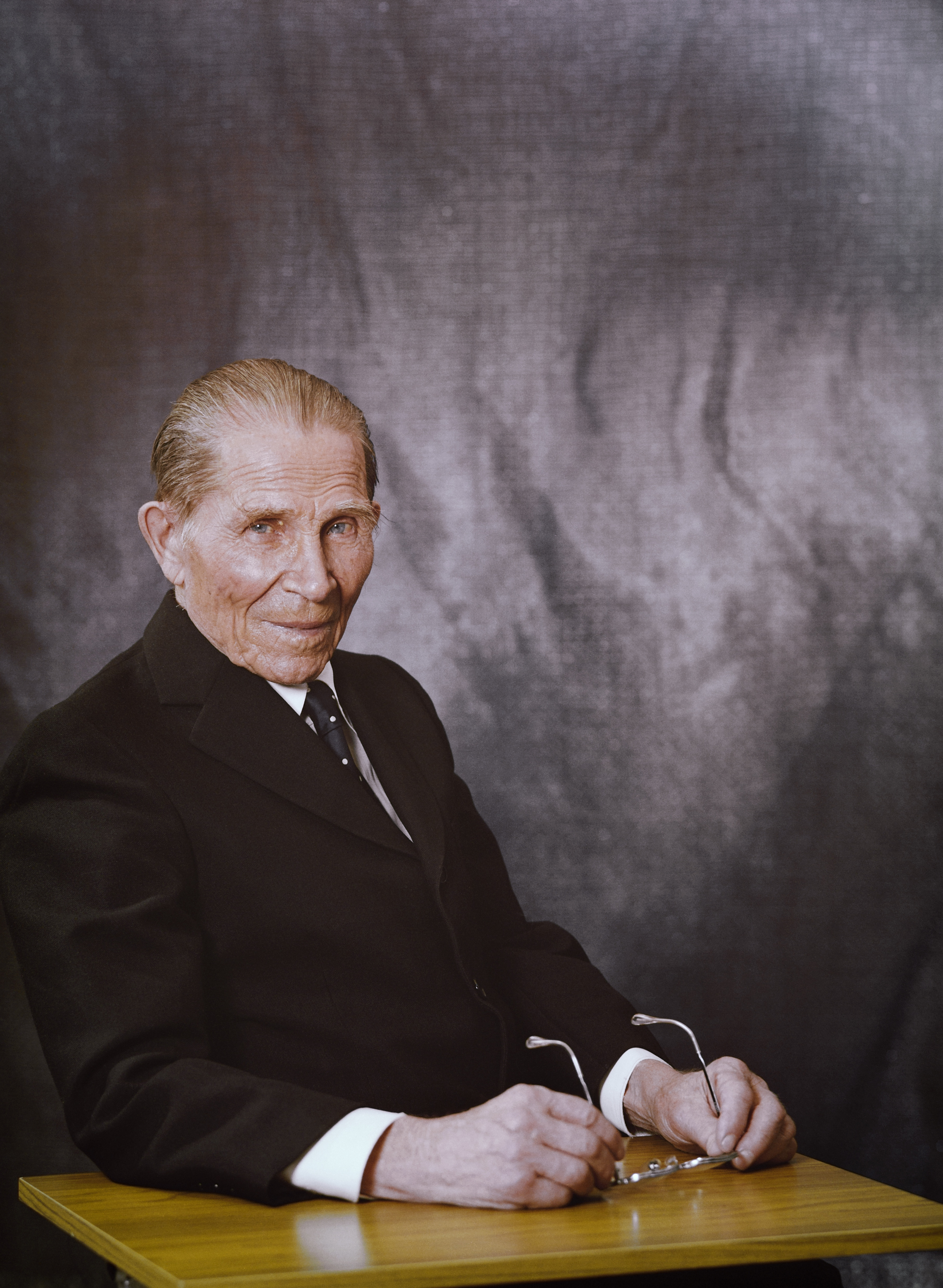
- Ylppö in 1978
- Born: Arvo Henrik Ylppö; 27 October 1887; Akaa, Grand Duchy of Finland
- Died: 28 January 1992 (aged 104); Helsinki, Finland
- Education: University of Helsinki
- Occupation: pediatrician

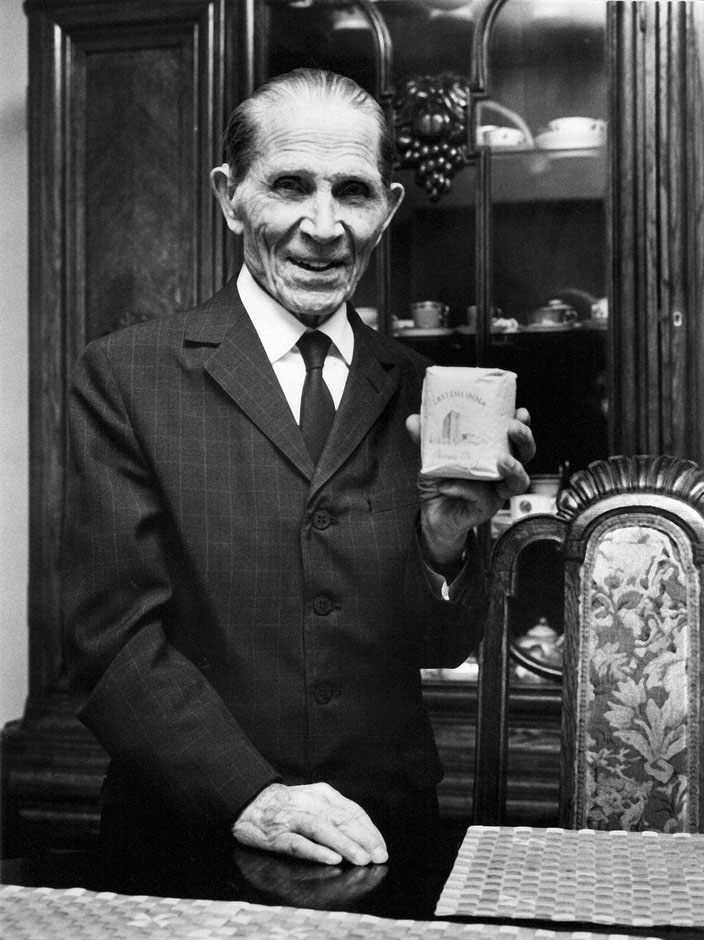
Arvo Ylppö in 1945.

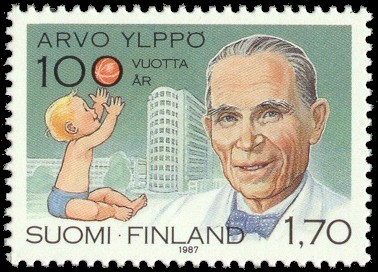
Ylppö portrayed on a 100th anniversary postage stamp published in 1987.

Arvo Henrik Ylppö (27 October 1887 – 28 January 1992) was a Finnish physician and professor of pediatrics who significantly decreased Finnish infant mortality during the 20th century. He is credited as the father of Finland's public maternity and child health clinic system established in 1922 (Finnish: neuvola), which focuses on monitoring the health and development of newborn and pre-school children and their families, providing parents with childcare guidance and supporting child-parent interaction. For forty years, Ylppö held the title of archiater (arkkiatri), the highest honorary title awarded to a physician. Internationally, he was known for his research on premature infants.

Ylppö was born in 1887 in Akaa, Finland into a farming family. He was apparently born premature and remained small in stature through his life. He entered the University of Helsinki in 1906 and decided to specialize in pediatric medicine. In 1912, he moved to the Imperial Children's Hospital in Berlin, Germany, where he wrote his thesis about infants' bilirubin metabolism in 1913. It was printed in Germany. He graduated as a medical doctor in March 1914 in Helsinki.

While in Germany, Ylppö concentrated on research about children's pathological anatomy and attracted international recognition. In his research, he observed that deaths of prematurely born infants are usually due to treatable conditions rather than simple underdevelopment, which motivated advancement of treatment of and science related to prematurely born infants.

After returning to Finland in 1920, he became a teacher at Helsinki University Hospital. In 1922, he established an advice centre for the care of young children in the Children's Castle (Lastenlinna) hospital, which is considered to be the beginning of child health clinics in Finland. In 1925, he became professor of pediatrics.

Ylppö continued his research, wrote extensively to medical journals about child care. He supported efforts to expand Finnish nurse training, Finnish pharmacy industry, and public awareness about medical matters. He retired as a professor in 1957 but still sponsored many childcare initiatives. From 1920 to 1963, he was chief physician at the Children's Castle hospital. He also had a private practice in Helsinki.

Arvo Ylppö died in January 1992 at the age of 104. He is buried in the Hietaniemi Cemetery in Helsinki.

== See also ==
- Children's Castle
- Mannerheim League for Child Welfare

Honorary titles
Preceded by Oswald Renkonen	Arkkiatri; 1952–1992	Succeeded by Nils Oker-Blom
