= Architecture of Finland =

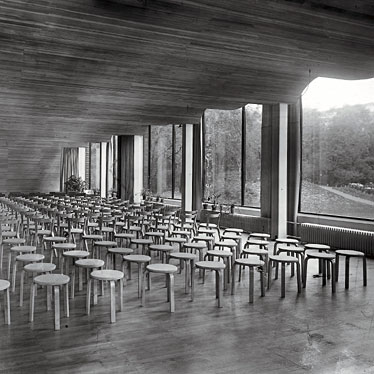
Vyborg Library (1927–1935), Alvar Aalto.

The architecture of Finland has a history spanning over 800 years, and while up until the modern era the architecture was highly influenced by Sweden, there were also influences from Germany and Russia. From the early 19th century onwards influences came directly from further afield: first when itinerant foreign architects took up positions in the country and then when the Finnish architect profession became established.

Furthermore, Finnish architecture in turn has contributed significantly to several styles internationally, such as Jugendstil (or Art Nouveau), Nordic Classicism and Functionalism. In particular, the works of the country's most noted early modernist architect Eliel Saarinen have had significant worldwide influence. Even more renowned than Saarinen has been modernist architect Alvar Aalto, who is regarded as one of the major figures in the world history of modern architecture. In an article from 1922 titled "Motifs from past ages", Aalto discussed national and international influences in Finland, and as he saw it:

Seeing how people in the past were able to be international and unprejudiced and yet remain true to themselves, we may accept impulses from old Italy, from Spain, and from the new America with open eyes. Our Finnish forefathers are still our masters.

In a 2000 review article of twentieth century Finnish architecture, Frédéric Edelmann, arts critic of the French newspaper Le Monde, suggested that Finland has more great architects of the status of Alvar Aalto in proportion to the population than any other country in the world. Finland's most significant architectural achievements are related to modern architecture, mostly because the current building stock has less than 20% that dates back to before 1955, which relates significantly to the reconstruction following World War II and the process of urbanisation which only gathered pace after the war.

1249 is the date normally given for the beginning of Swedish rule over the land now known as Finland (in Finnish, Suomi), and this rule continued until 1809, after which the Grand Duchy of Finland was established within the Russian Empire. Finland declared its full independence in 1917, during the Russian Revolution. These historical factors have had a significant impact on the history of architecture in Finland, along with the founding of towns and the building of castles and fortresses (in the numerous wars between Sweden and Russia fought in Finland), as well as the availability of building materials and craftsmanship and, later on, government policy on issues such as housing and public buildings. As an essentially forested region, timber has been the natural building material, while the hardness of the local stone (predominantly granite) initially made it difficult to work, and the manufacture of brick was rare before the mid-19th century. The use of concrete took on a particular prominence with the rise of the welfare state in the 1960s, in particular in state-sanctioned housing with the dominance of prefabricated concrete elements. However, with recent concerns regarding sustainability in building construction there has been a gradual increase in the use of wood, and not merely as a finishing material but also for the main structure.

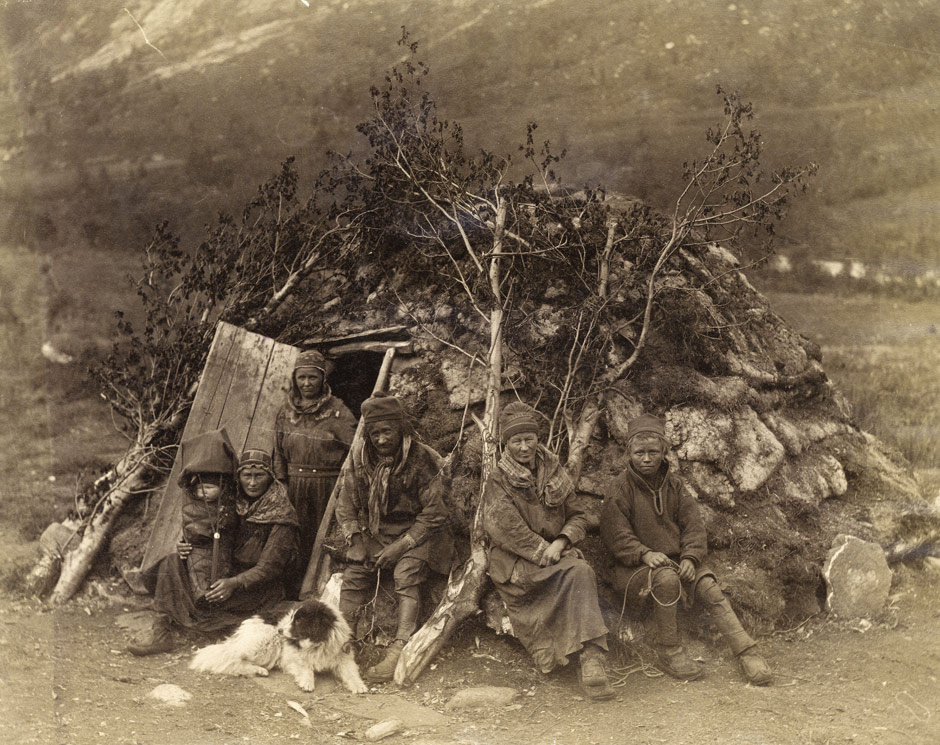
Sami Kota or Goahti in the 1870s

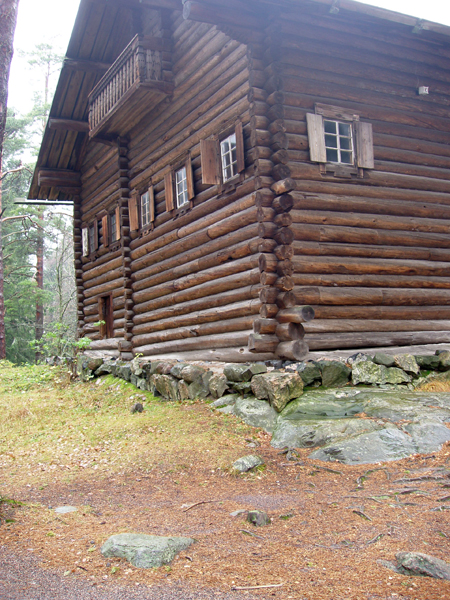
Pertinotsa farmhouse, Seurasaari

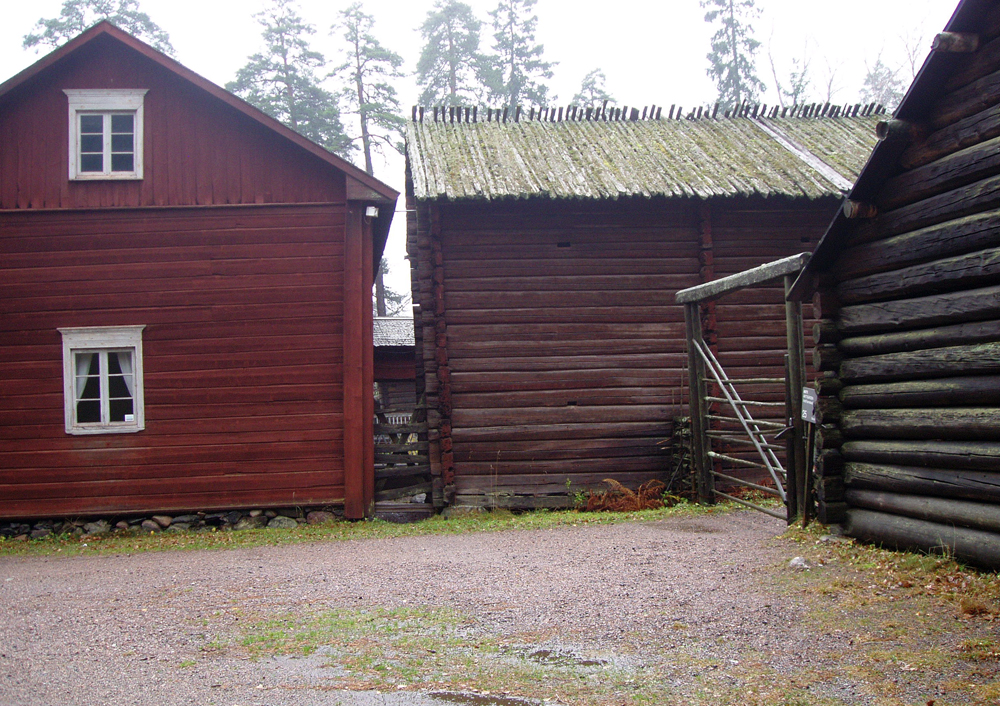
The Antti farmstead, Seurasaari

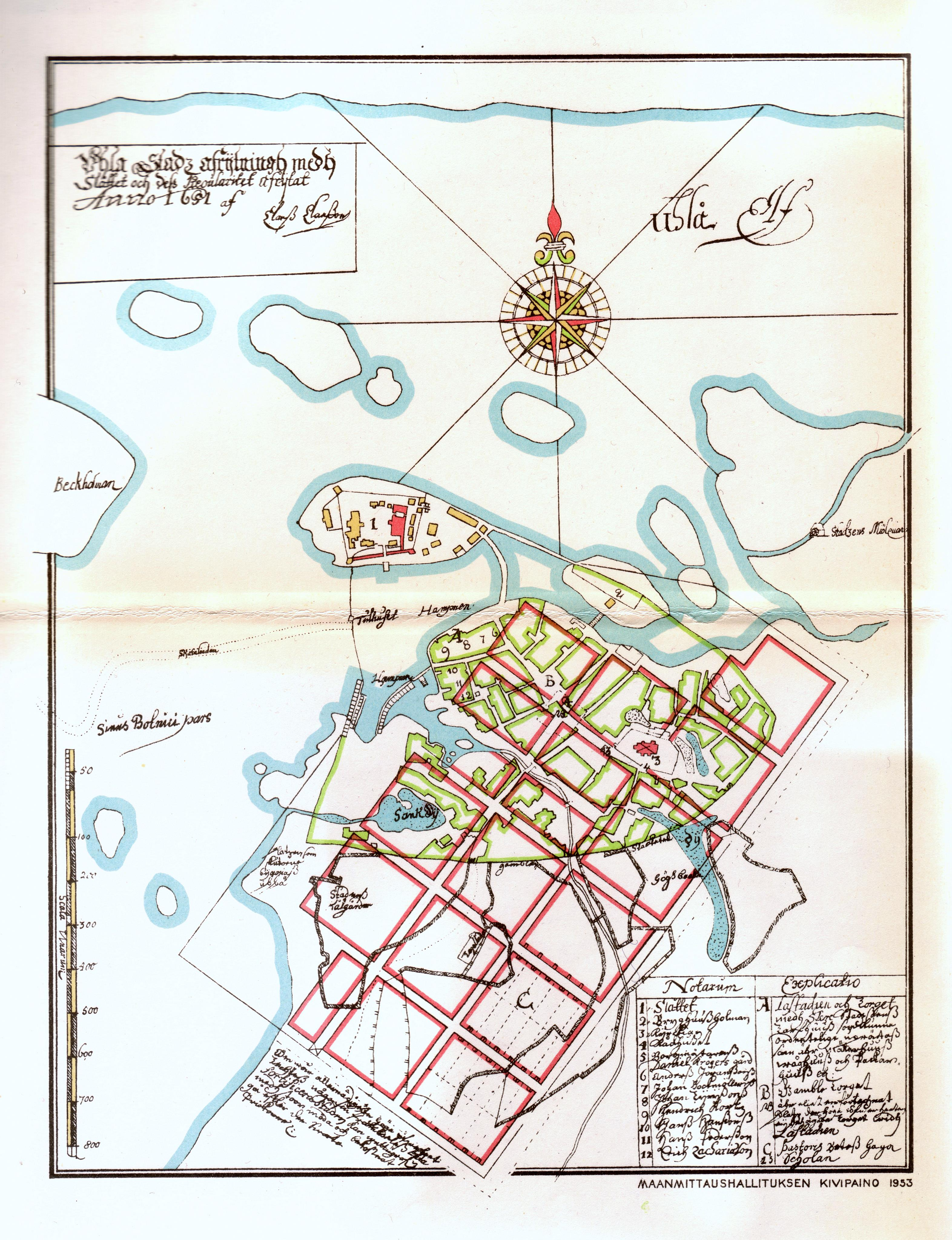
Claes Claesson's town plan for Oulu, 1651

== From early architecture to 1809 (including the Swedish colonial period) ==
=== The dominance of wood construction ===
The vernacular architecture of Finland is generally characterised by the predominant use of wooden construction. The oldest known dwelling structure is the so-called kota, a goahti, hut or tent with a covering in fabric, peat, moss, or timber. The building type remained in use throughout Finland until the 19th century, and is still in use among the Sami people in Lapland. The sauna is also a traditional building type in Finland: the oldest known saunas in Finland were made from pits dug into a slope in the ground and primarily used as dwellings in the wintertime. The first Finnish saunas are what nowadays are called "smoke saunas". These differed from modern saunas in that they had no windows and were heated by heating up a pile of rocks (called kiuas) by burning large amounts of wood for about 6–8 hours, and then letting the smoke out through a hatch before entering to enjoy the sauna heat (called löyly).

The tradition of wood construction - beyond the kota hut - has been common throughout the entire northern boreal coniferous zone since prehistoric times. The central structural factor in its success was the corner joining - or "corner-timbering" - technique, whereby logs are laid horizontally in succession and notched at the ends to form tightly secure joints. The origins of the technique are uncertain; though it was used by the Romans in northern Europe in the first century BC, other possible older sources are said to be areas of present-day Russia, but also it is said to have been common among the Indo-Aryan peoples of Eastern Europe, the Near East, Iran and India. Crucial in the development of the "corner-timbering" technique were the necessary tools, primarily an axe rather than a saw. The resulting building type, a rectangular plan, originally comprising a single interior space and with a low-pitched saddle-back roof, is of the same origin as the megaron, the early Greek dwelling house. Its first use in Finland may have been as a storehouse, and later a sauna and then domestic house. The first examples of the "corner-timbering" technique would have used round logs, but a more developed form soon emerged, shaping logs with an axe to a square shape for a surer fit and better insulation. Hewing with an axe was seen as preferable to sawing because the axe-cut surfaces were better in abating water penetration.

According to historians, though the principles of wooden construction may have arrived in Finland from elsewhere, one particular innovation in wooden construction seems to be unique to Finland, the so-called block pillar church (tukipilarikirkko). Though ostensibly looking like a normal wooden church, the novelty involved the construction of hollow pillars from logs built into the exterior walls, making the walls themselves structurally unnecessary. The pillars are tied internally across the nave by large joists. Usually there were two, but occasionally three pillars on each longitudinal wall. The largest preserved block pillar church is at Tornio (1686). Other examples are the churches of Vörå (1627) and Tervola (1687).

In later developments, most particularly in urban contexts, the log frame was then further covered in a layer of wooden planks. It is hypothesised that it was only from the 16th century onwards that wooden houses were painted in the familiar red-ochre or punamulta, containing up to 95% iron oxide, often mixed with tar. The balloon framing technique for timber construction popularized throughout North America only came to Finland in the 20th century. Finnish master builders had travelled to the US to see how the industrialisation of the timber-framing technique had developed and wrote about it positively in trade journals on their return. Some experiments were made in using the wooden frame, but initially it was not popular. One reason was the thin construction's poor climatic performance (improved in the 1930s with the addition of insulation): also significant was the relatively low price of both timber and labour in Finland. However, by the outbreak of the First World War, the industrialised timber construction system had become more widespread. Also a comparatively recent "import" to Finland is the use of wooden shingles for roofs, dating only from the early 19th century. Previous to that, the traditional system had been a so-called birch-bark roof (in Finnish, malkakatto), comprising a wooden slat base, overlaid with several layers of birch-bark and finished off with a layer of long timber poles by weighed down in places by the occasional boulder. Traditionally, the whole structure was unpainted. The coating of shingles with tar was the modern appropriation of a material first produced in the Nordic countries during the Iron Age, a major export product, especially in sealing wooden boats.

The traditional timber house in Finland was generally of two types: i. Eastern Finland, influenced by Russian traditions. For example, in the Pertinotsa house (now in the Seurasaari Open Air Museum in Helsinki) the family's dwelling rooms are on the upper floors while the animal barns and storerooms are on the ground floor, with hay lofts above them; ii. Western Finland, influenced by Swedish traditions. For example, in the Antti farmstead, originally from the village of Säkylä (nowadays also in Seurasaari), the farmstead consisted of a group of individual log buildings placed around a central farmyard. Traditionally, the first building to be constructed in such a farmstead was the sauna, followed by the first or main room ("tupa") of the main house, where the family would cook, eat and sleep. In summertime they would cook outdoors, and some family members would even choose to sleep in the barns.

The development of wood construction to a more refined level occurred, however, in the construction of churches. The earliest examples were not designed by architects but rather by master builders, who also were responsible for their construction. One of the oldest known wooden church is that of Santamala, in Nousiainen (only archaeological remains existing), dating from the 12th century, with a simple rectangular ground plan of 11,5 x 15 metres. The oldest preserved wooden churches in Finland date back to the 17th century (e.g. Sodankylä Old Church, Lapland, 1689); none of the medieval churches are remaining as, like all wooden buildings, they were susceptible to fire. Indeed, only 16 wooden churches from the 17th century still exist - though it was not uncommon to demolish a wooden church to make way for a larger stone one.

The designs of the wooden churches were clearly influenced by the church architecture from central and southern Europe as well as Russia, with cruciform plans and Gothic, Romanesque and Renaissance features and detailing. These influences most often, however, came via Sweden. The development of the wooden church in Finland is marked by greater complexity in the plan, the increased size and the refinement of details. The "Lapp Church" of Sodankylä (c. 1689), Finland's best-preserved and least changed wooden church, is a simple, unpainted rectangular saddle-back-roofed block, measuring 13 x 8,5 metres with the walls rising to 3,85 metres, and resembling a peasant dwelling. By contrast, Petäjävesi church (planned and built by master builder Jaakko Klemetinpoika Leppänen, 1765) plus the additional sacristy and belfry (Erkki Leppänen, 1821) (a World Heritage Site), though also unpainted on the exterior, has a refined cross plan with even-sized arms, 18 x 18 metres, with a 13-metre-tall interior wooden vault. The atmosphere of the interior of Petäjävesi church is regarded as unique; the large windows, unusual for log construction, give it a soft light.

Even at the time of the building of Petäjävesi church, with its "cross plan", more complex ground plans had already existed in Finland, but in later years the ground plans would become even more complex. The first so-called "double cross plan" in Finland was probably the Ulrika Eleonora church in Hamina (1731, burnt down 1742), built under the direction of master builder Henrik Schultz. It was then replaced by a somewhat similar church, the Church of Elisabet in Hamina (1748–51, destroyed 1821), built under the direction of Arvi Junkkarinen. The double cruciform plan entailed a cross with extensions at the inner corners. This became a model for later churches, for example, Mikkeli church (1754, destroyed 1806) and Lappee church (Juhana Salonen, 1794), the latter incorporating yet a further development, where the transepts of the cross plan are tapered and even chamfered at the corners, as one sees in the plan of the Ruovesi church (1776). Historian Lars Pettersson has suggested that the Katarina Church (1724) in Stockholm, by the French-born architect Jean de la Vallée was the model for the plan of Hamina church and hence the development that followed.

During the Middle Ages there were only 6 towns in Finland (Turku, Porvoo, Naantali, Rauma, Ulvila and Vyborg), with wooden buildings growing organically around a stone church and/or castle. Historian Henrik Lilius has pointed out that Finnish wooden towns were on average destroyed by fire every 30–40 years. They were never rebuilt exactly as they had existed before, and the fire damage offered the opportunity to create new urban structures in accordance with any reigning ideals: for example, completely new grid plans, straightening and widening streets, codes for constructing buildings in stone (in practice often ignored) and the introduction of "fire breaks" in the form of green areas between properties. As a consequence of fires, the greatest part of the wooden towns which have been preserved date from the nineteenth century. For example, the town of Oulu was founded in 1605 by Charles IX beside a medieval castle and, typical for its time, grew organically. In 1651 Claes Claesson drew up a new plan comprising a regular street grid, his proposal outlined on top of the existing "medieval" situation, but still retaining the position of the existing church. Over the following years, there more fires (significantly in 1822 and 1824) and yet more exacting regulations in new town plans regarding wider streets and fire breaks. Of Finland's 6 medieval towns, only Porvoo has retained its medieval town plan.

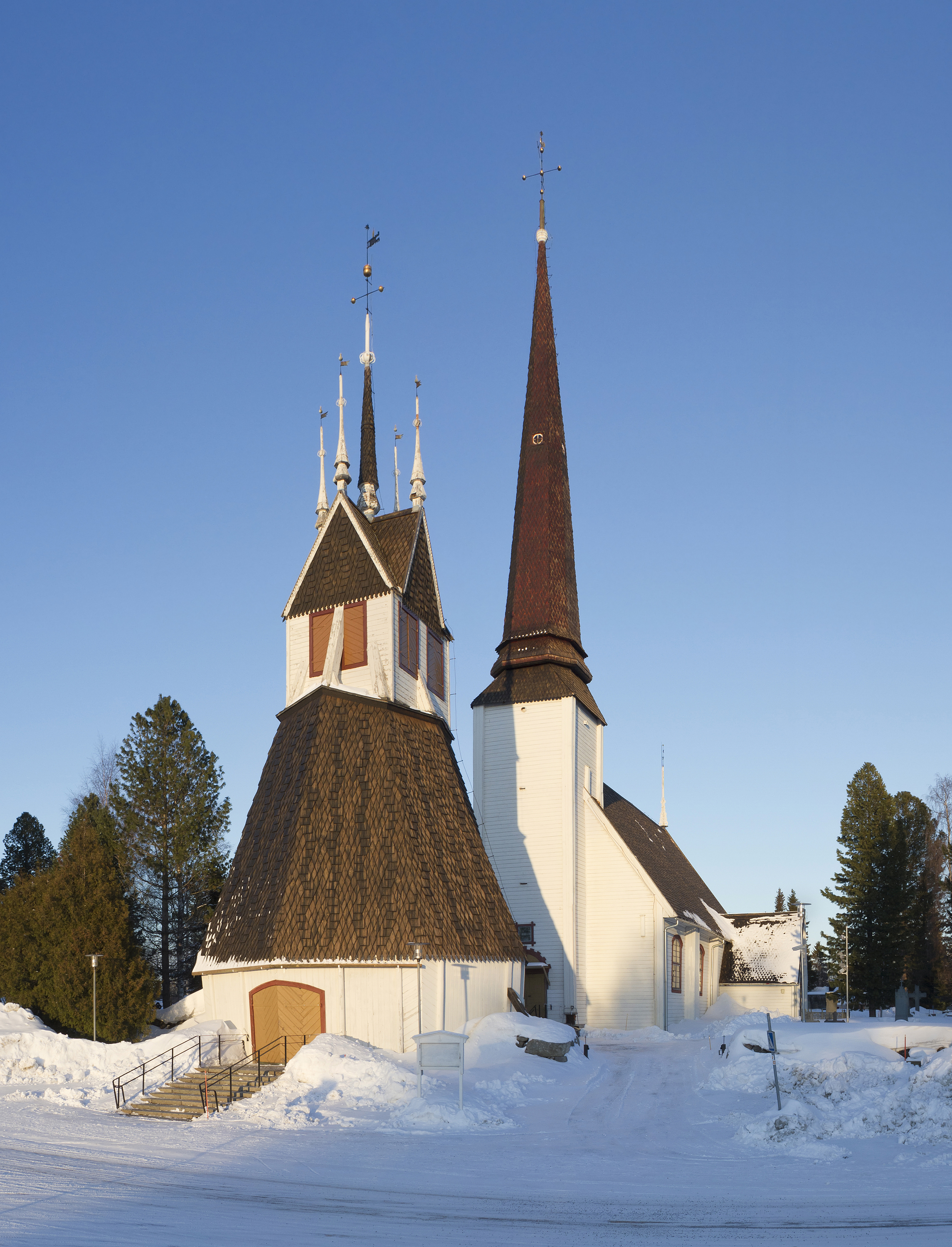
Tornio block-pillar church, 1686.

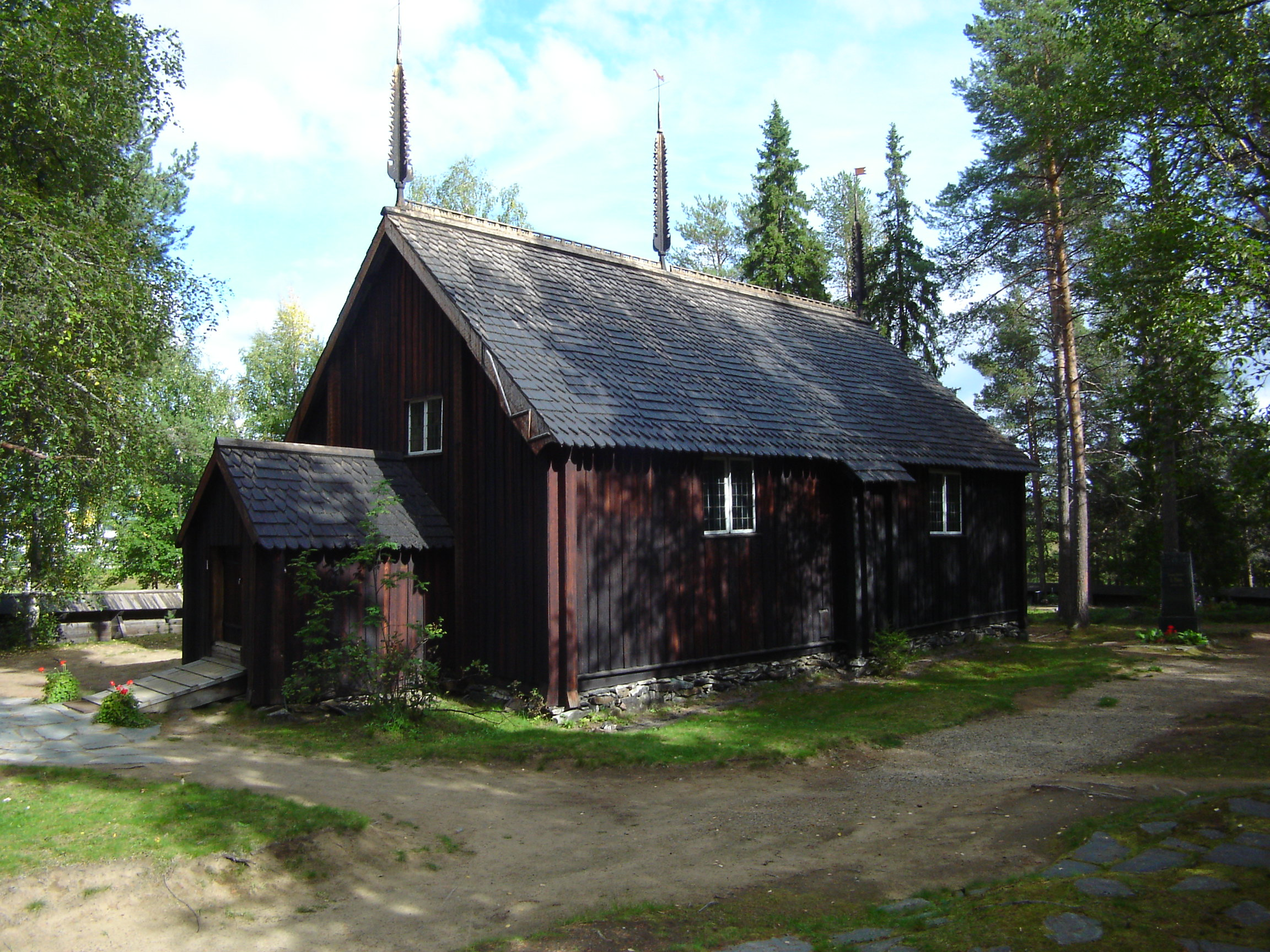
Sodankylä Old Church, Lapland, c.1689.

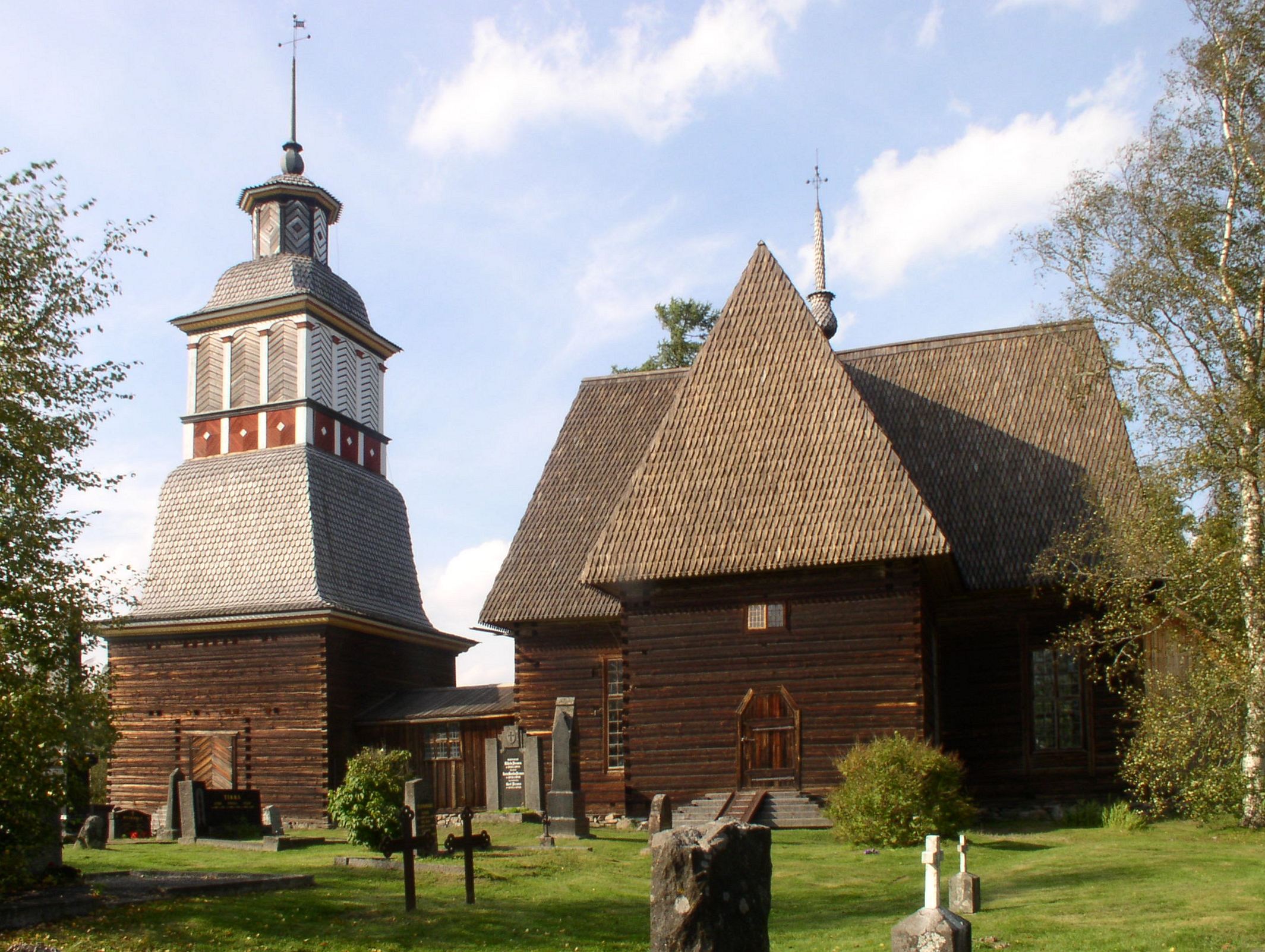
Petäjävesi Old Church, "cross plan", 1765, bell tower 1861.

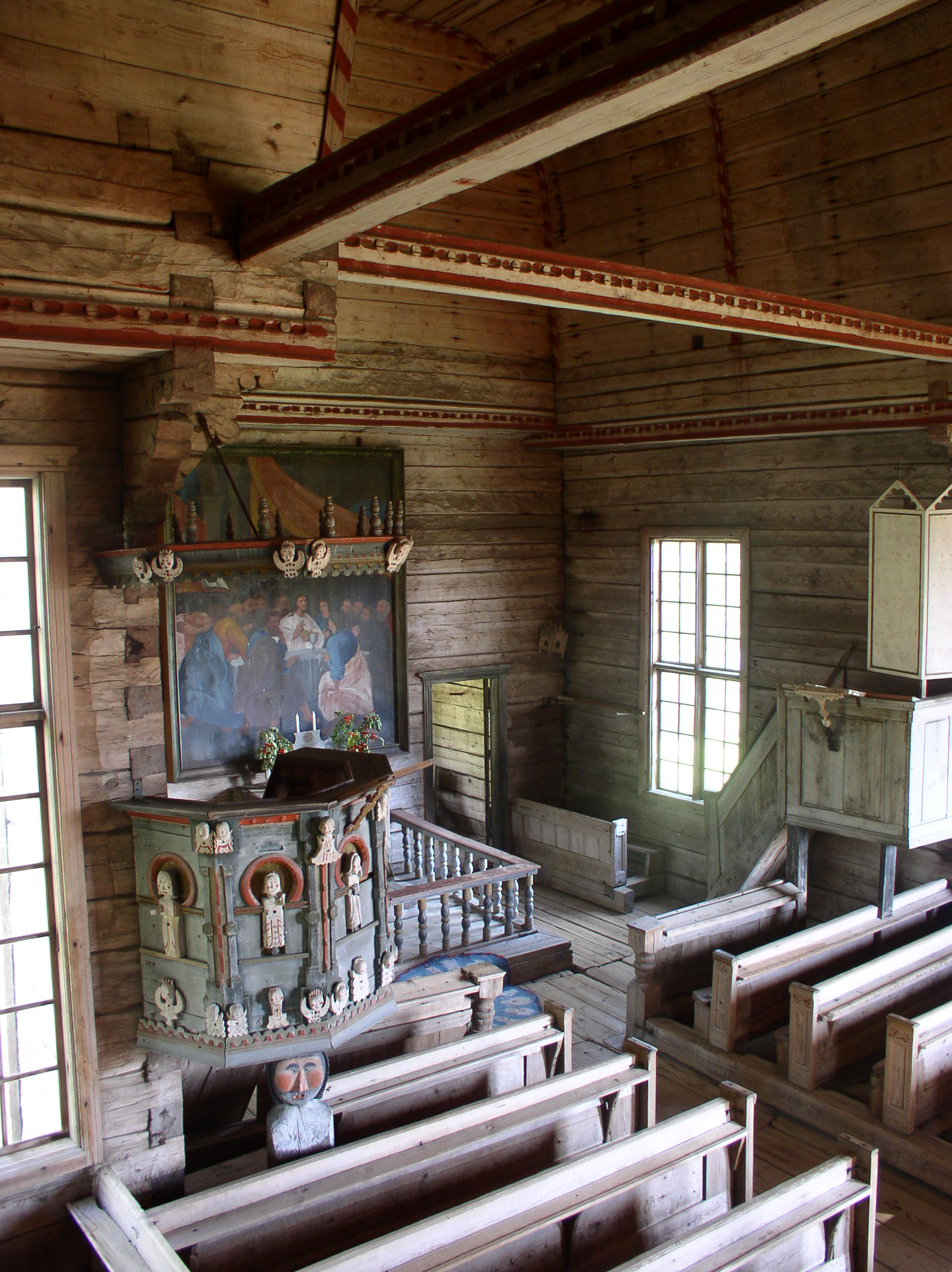
Petäjävesi Old Church interior.

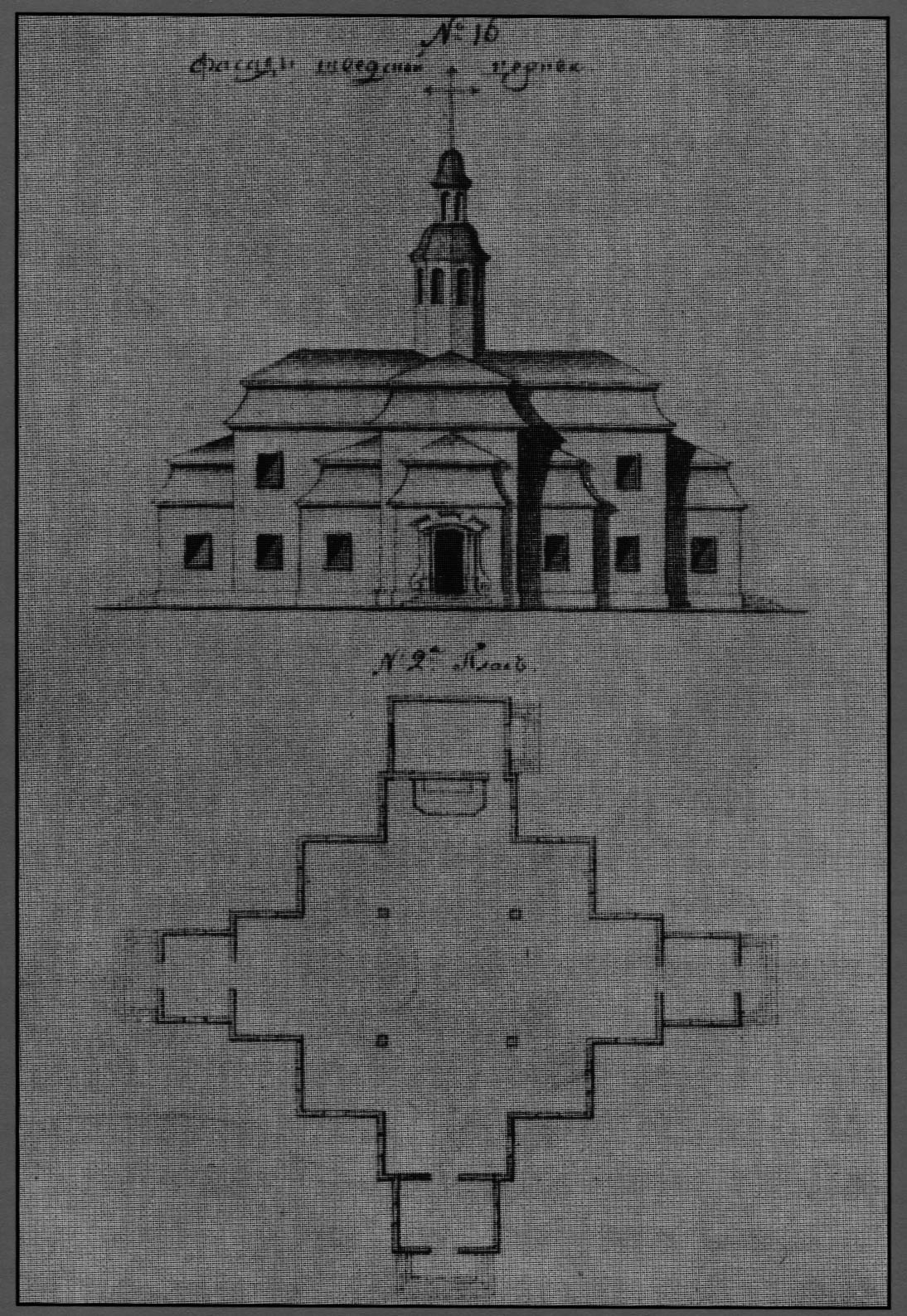
Elisabet Church, Hamina, "double cross plan", 1748–51, destroyed 1821.

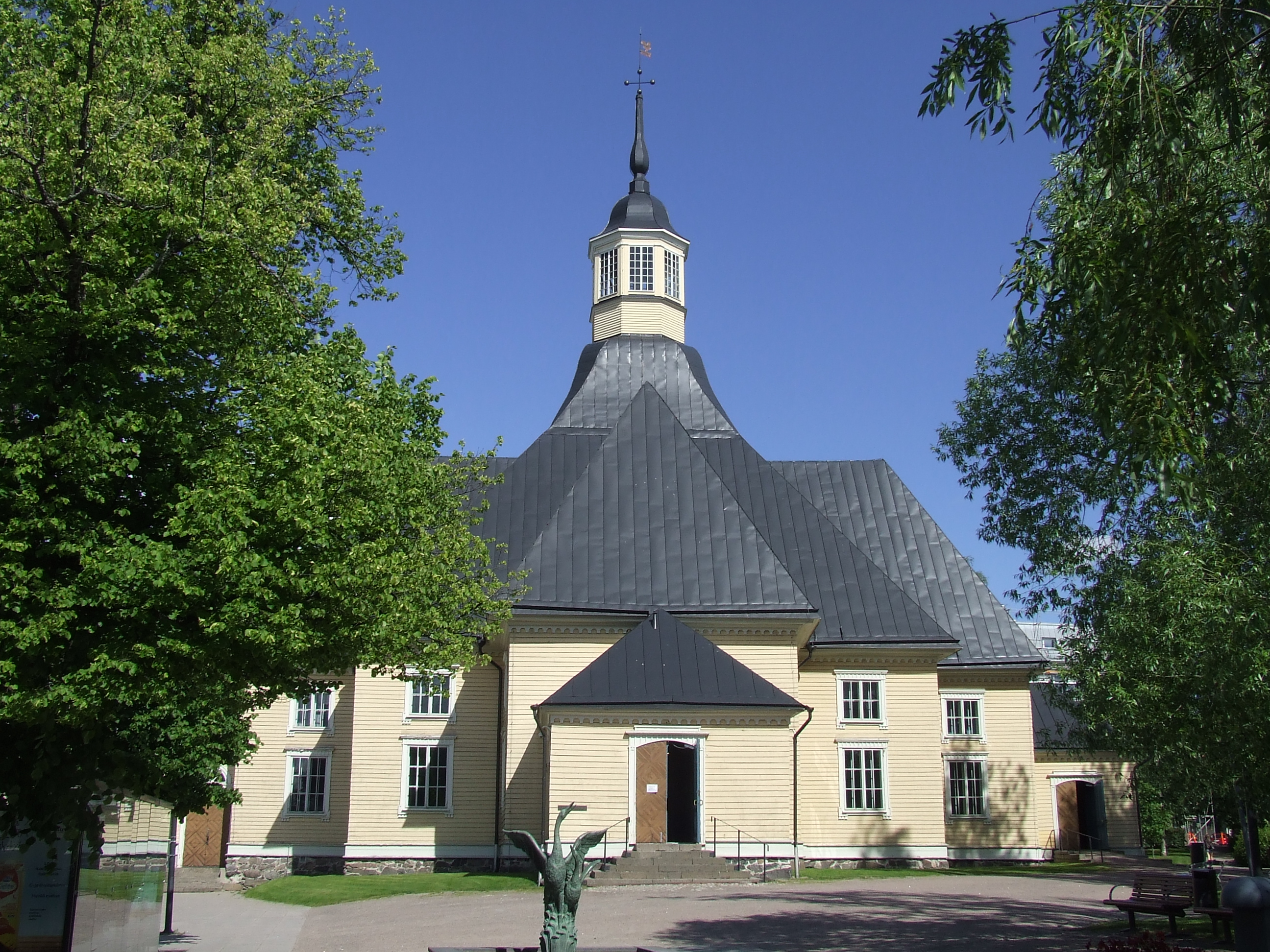
Lappee church, 1799.

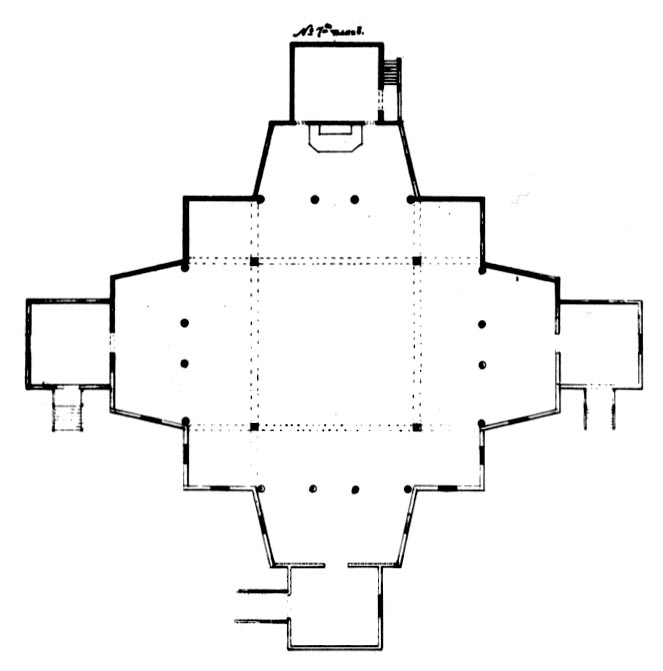
Lappee church, "double cross plan", 1799.

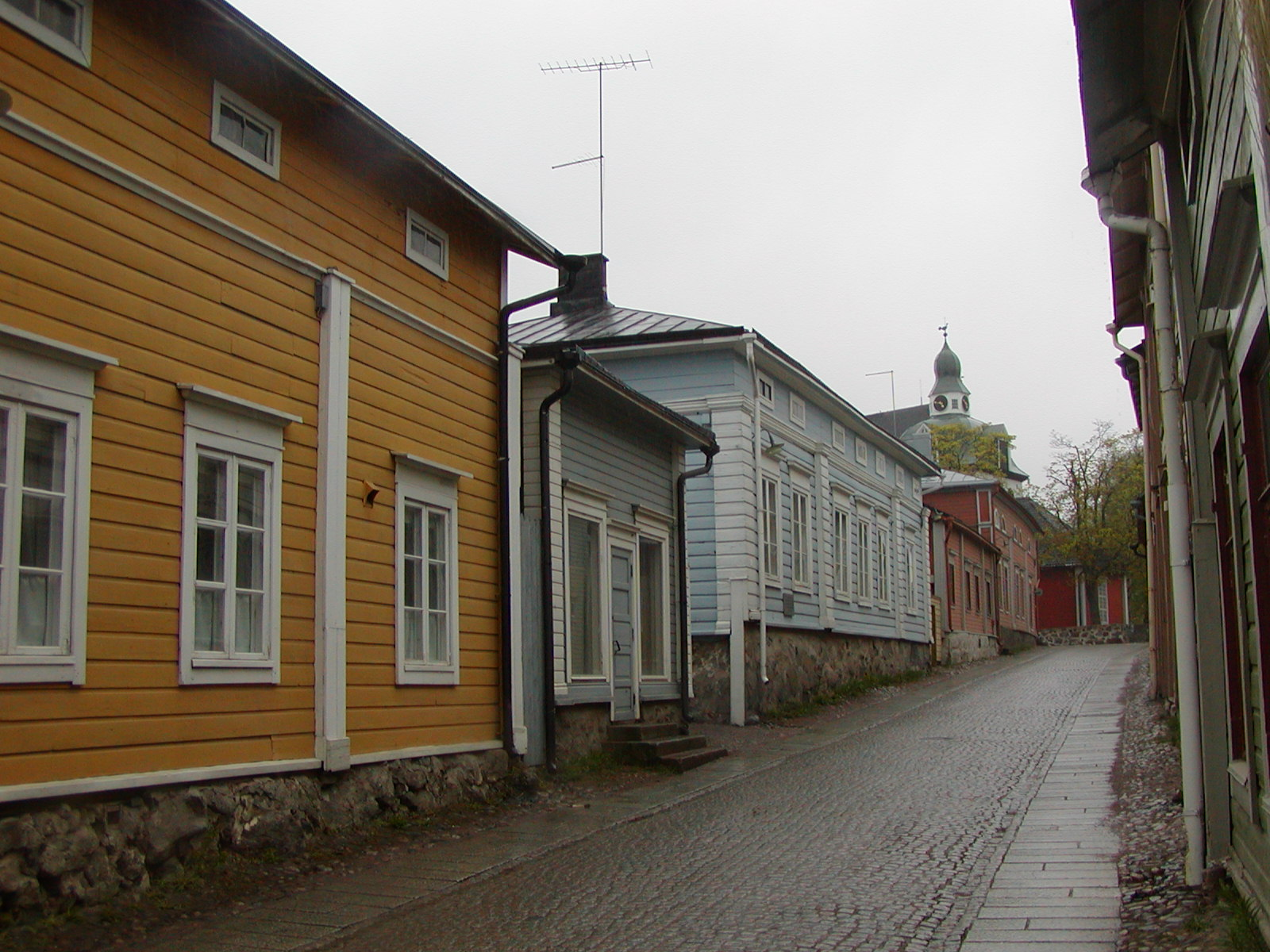
Cathedral and wooden houses of Old Porvoo.

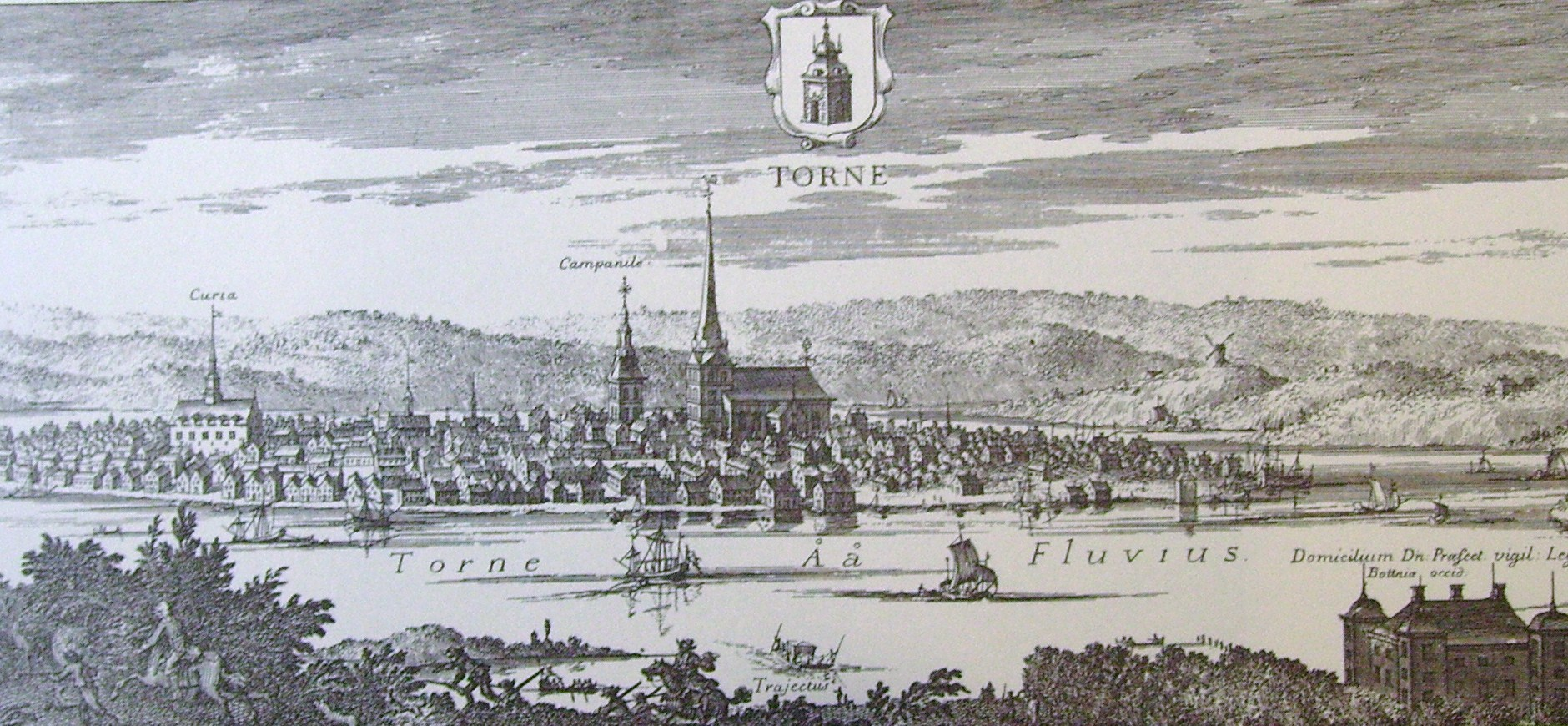
Torneå (founded 1620) as depicted in Dahlbergh's Suecia Antiqua et Hodierna, 1716.

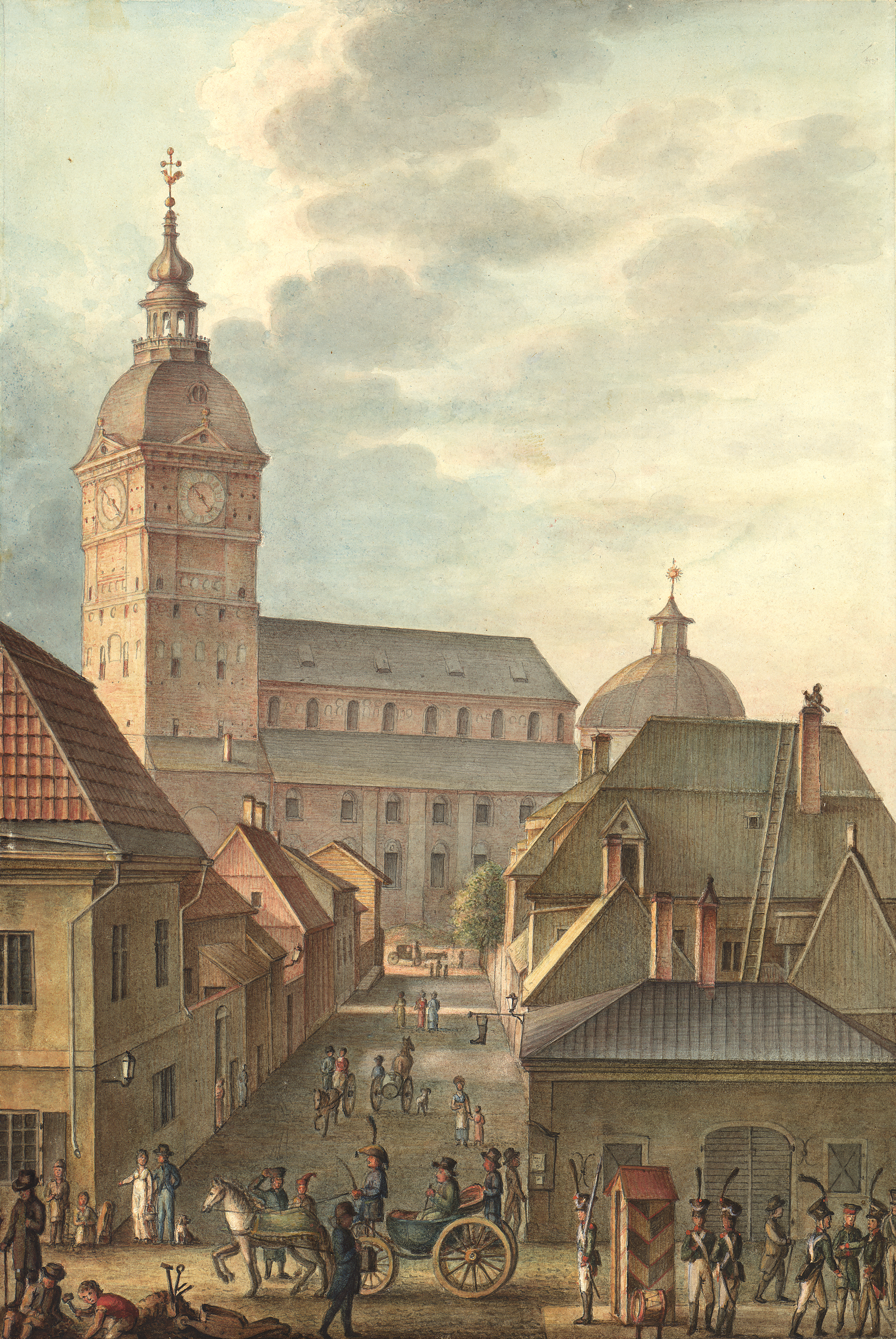
View of Turku Cathedral before the Great Fire of 1827.

=== The development of stone construction ===
The use of stone construction in Finland was initially limited to the few medieval castles and churches in the country. The construction of castles was part of a project by the Swedish crown to construct both defensive and administrative centres throughout Finland. Six castles of national importance were built during the medieval period, from the second half of the 13th century onwards: Kastelholm in Åland, Turku, and Raseborg on the south-west coast, Vyborg on an islet off the south-east coast and Häme and Olavinlinna further inland. The northernmost castle, and situated even further inland, Kajaani, dates from the beginning of the 17th century. Kuusisto, on an island of the same name, and Korsholma on the coast also dates from this later period. The earlier parts of the castle constructions are characterised by heavy granite boulder constructions, but with ever more refined details in later periods. Strategically, the two most important castle were that of Turku and Vyborg. The three high-medieval Finnish "castle fiefs" were ruled until the 1360s from the castles of Turku, Hämeenlinna and Vyborg. By the beginning of the 14th century, Turku Castle was one of the largest in northern Europe, with over 40 rooms and by the mid-16th century received further changes to withstand cannon fire. Construction of Vyborg castle started in 1293 by order of Torkel Knutsson, Lord High Constable of Sweden. The documentation for the construction of Olavinlinna is unusually clear: it was founded precisely in 1475 by a Danish-born knight, Erik Axelsson Tott who worked in the service of the Swedish crown and was also governor of Vyborg castle; the castle's strategic significance, along with Vyborg castle, was to protect the eastern border from the Novgorod Republic to the east. According to Axelsson's own account, the castle was built by "16 good foreign master masons" - some of them from Tallinn. The castle is built on an island in the Kyrönsalmi strait that connects the lakes Haukivesi and Pihlajavesi; the design was based on the idea of 3 large towers in a line facing north-west and an encircling wall. The castle's present good state of repair is due to a thorough restoration carried out in the 1960s and 70s. Häme Castle, the oldest parts built in stone, said to originate in the 1260s, was originally built in wood, then rebuilt in stone, but then transformed radically in the 14th century in red brick, unique for Finland, with extra lines of defence also in brick added beyond the central bastion. In the 19th century it was converted into a prison in accordance with a design by architect Carl Ludvig Engel.

The Medieval stone building tradition in Finland is also preserved in 73 stone churches and 9 stone sacristies added to otherwise originally wood churches. Probably the oldest stone church is the Church of St. Olaf in Jomala, Åland, completed in 1260–1280. The stone churches are characterised by their massive walls, and predominantly with a single interior space. Small details, such as windows would sometimes be decorated with redbrick detailing, in particular in the gables (e.g. Sipoo Old Church, 1454). An exception among the churches was Turku Cathedral; it was originally built in wood in the late 13th century, but was considerably expanded in the 14th and 15th centuries, mainly in stone but also using brick. The cathedral was badly damaged during the Great Fire of Turku in 1827, and was rebuilt to a great extent afterwards in brick.

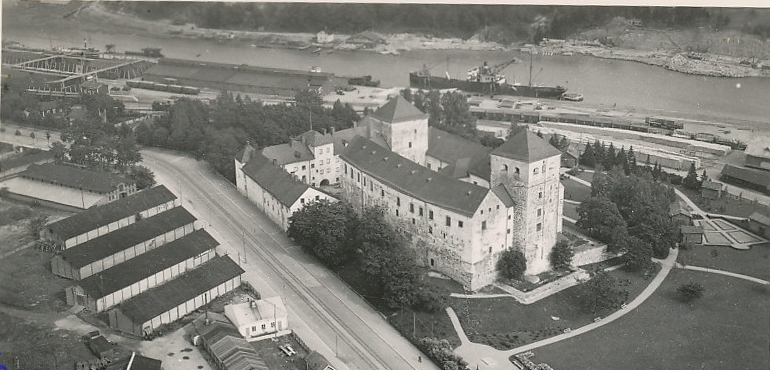
Turku Castle, 13th century, viewed in 1934.

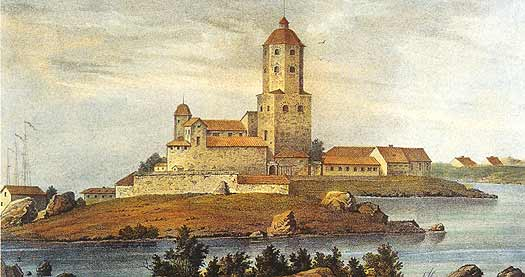
Vyborg Castle, 13th century, depicted by Torsten Wilhelm Forstén in 1840.

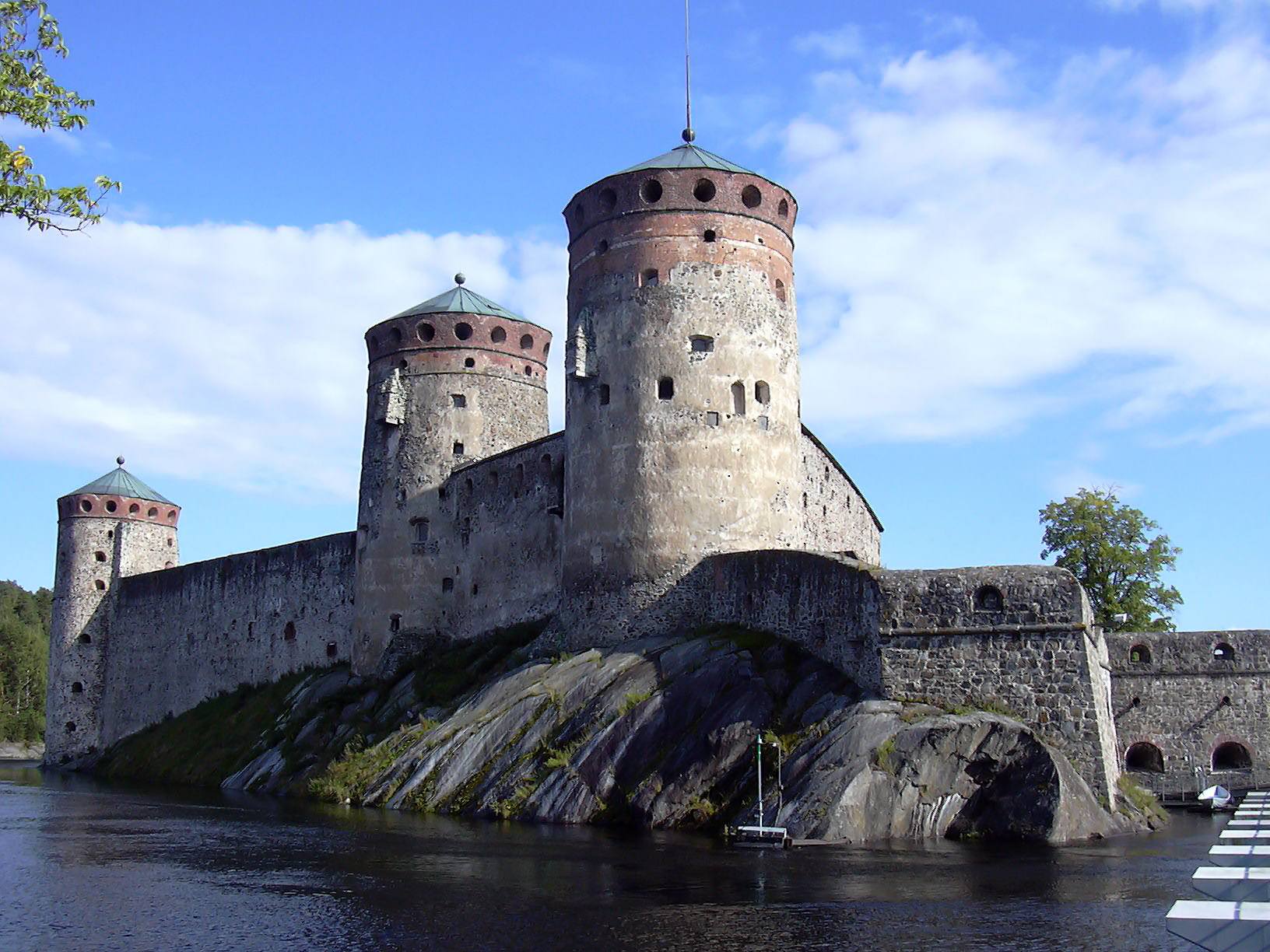
Olavinlinna castle dates from 1475.

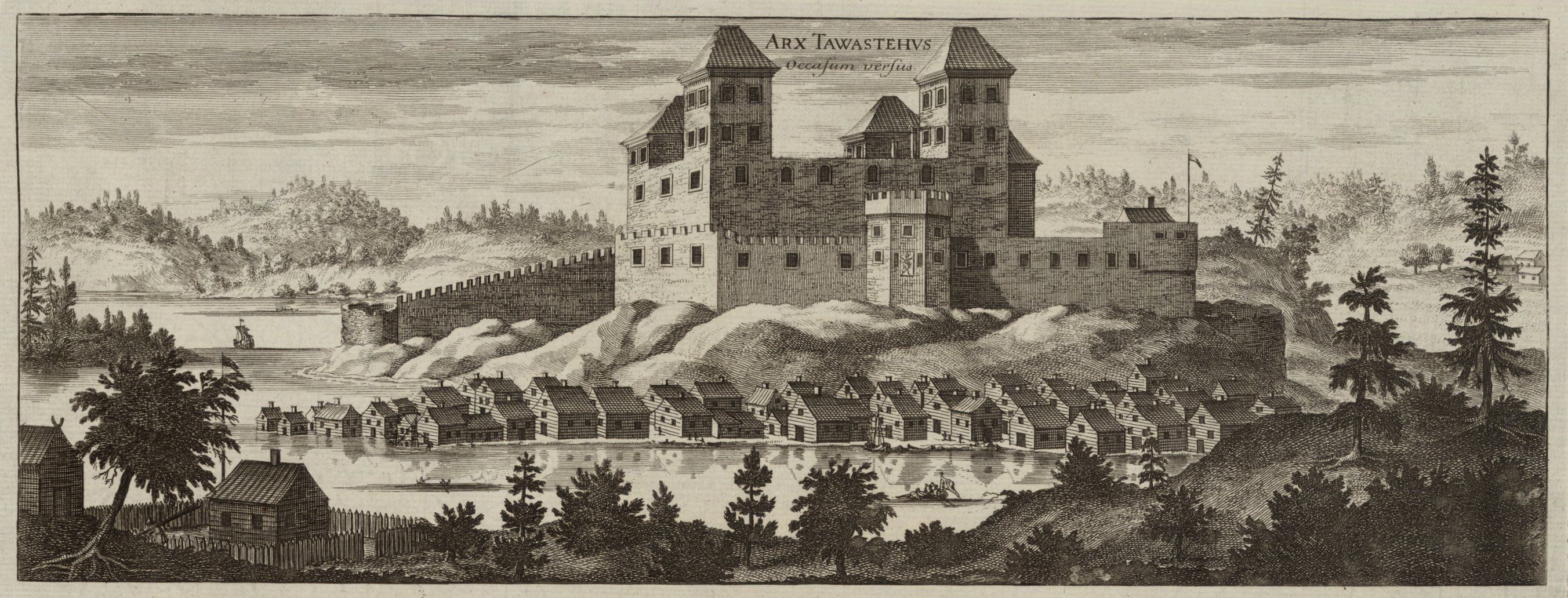
Häme Castle featured in Erik Dahlbergh's Suecia Antiqua et Hodierna, 1660-1716.

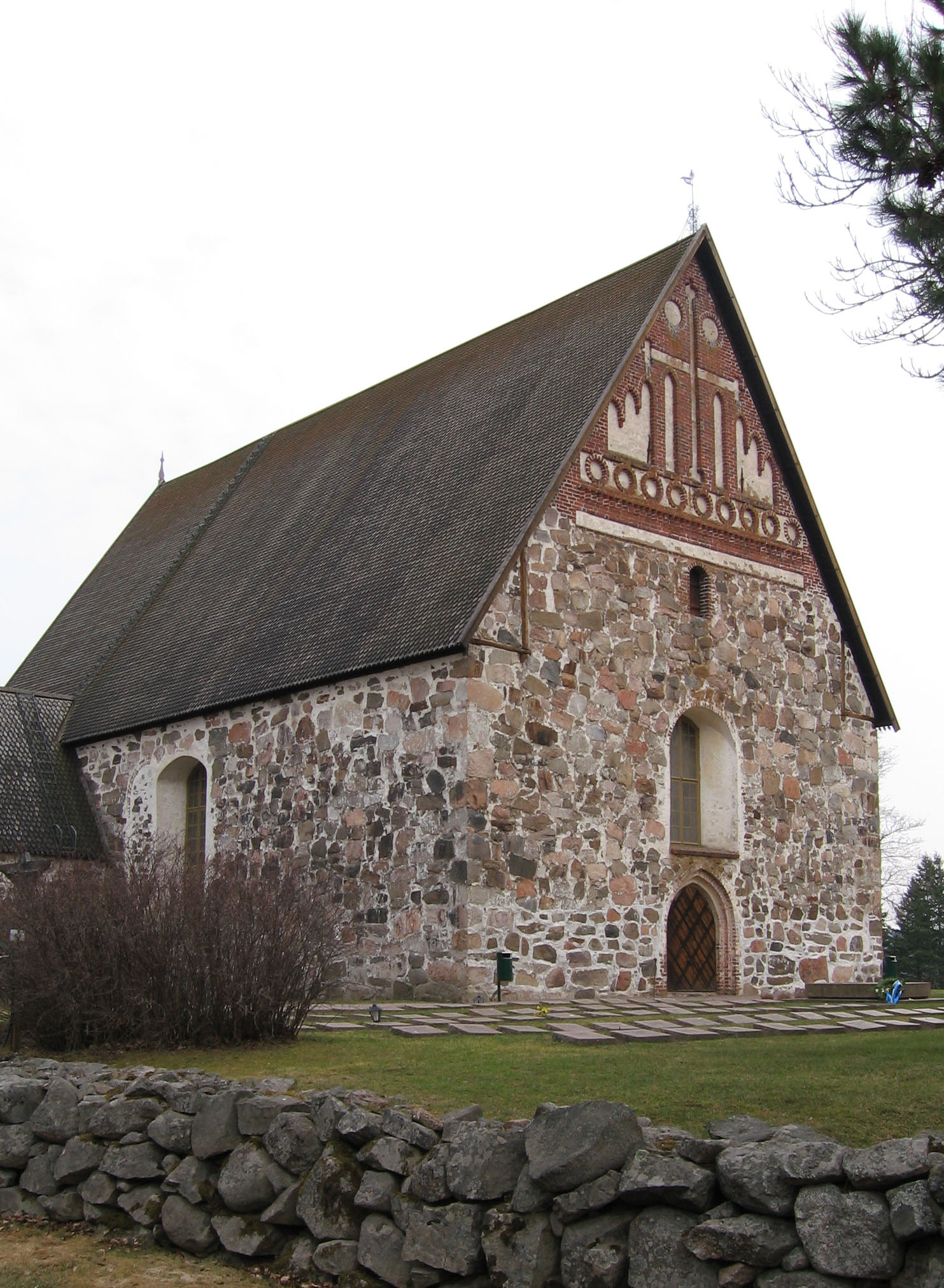
Sipoo Old Church (St. Sigfried's Church), 1454.

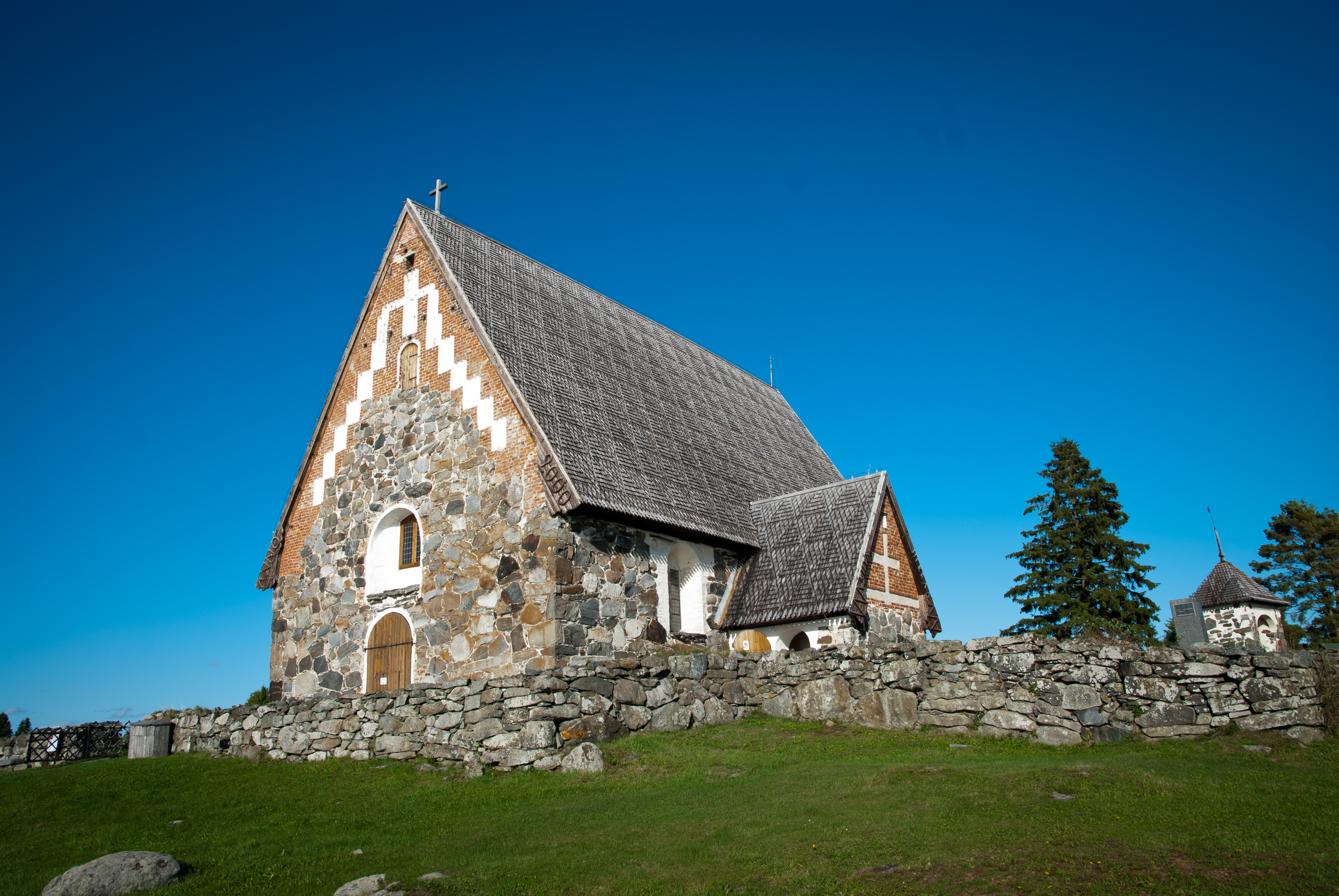
St. Olaf's Church, Tyrvää, c. 1516

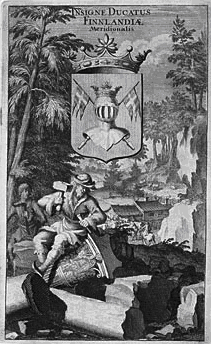
"South Finland", Erik Dahlbergh, Suecia Antiqua et Hodierna, 1660–1716.

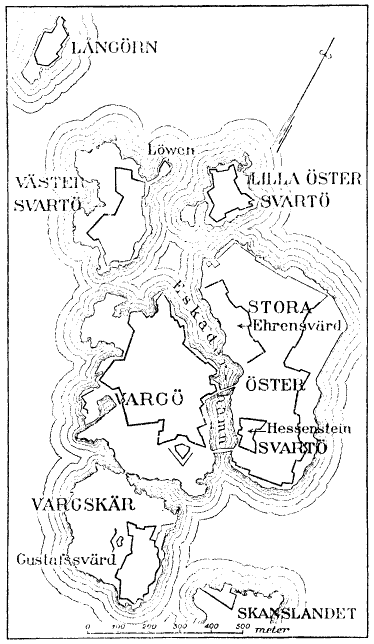
Sveaborg fortress, Helsinki, 1747-. Plan showing fortification lines.

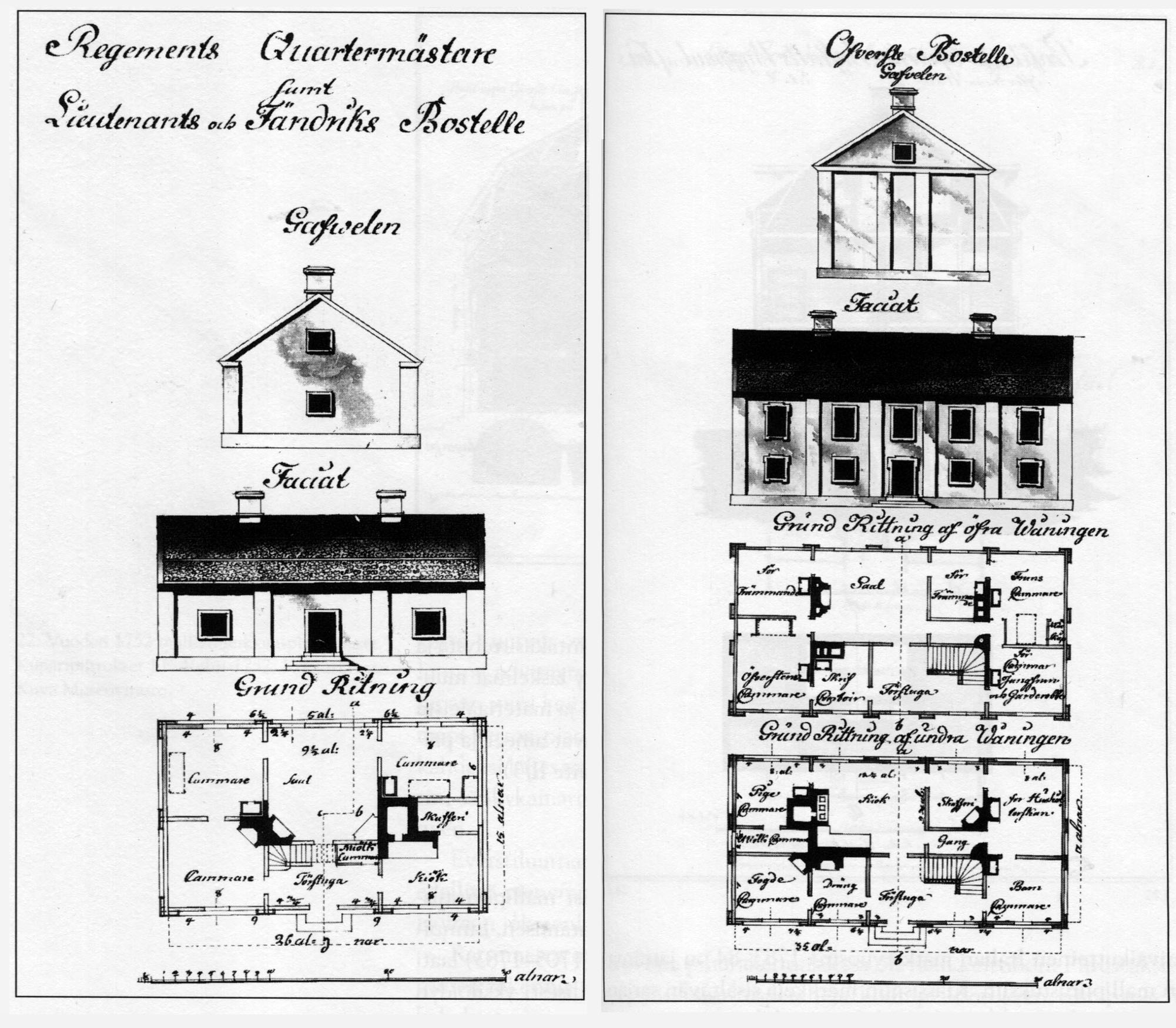
"Standard drawings" for army personnel homes, quartermaster and colonel, J.B. Virgin, 1766.

Already in the mid-16th century there was the odd example of importing refined Renaissance architecture principles to Finland. Duke John of Finland (later King John III of Sweden) (1537–92) built refined Renaissance interiors in the otherwise medieval Turku Castle. However, during the 17th century Sweden became a major political power in Europe, extending its territory into present day Estonia, Russia and Poland - and this expansiveness was reflected in its architecture over the next century. These architectural ambitions were realised in Finland, too, and markedly in the founding of new towns. Four new towns were founded along the Gulf of Bothnia on the west coast of Finland during the reign of Gustavus II Adolphus: Nystad (Uusikaupunki in Finnish) in 1617, and Nykarleby (Uusikaarlepyy in Finnish), Karleby (Kokkola in Finnish) and Torneå (Tornio in Finnish) in 1620. All these are characterised by strict grid street plans, which were filled in with single-storey vernacular-style wooden buildings. Even stricter building and planning regulations came with the appointment of Per Brahe as Governor-General of Finland in 1637 (a position he held intermittently until 1653). Among the new towns founded by Brahe were Hämeenlinna, Savonlinna, Kajaani, Raahe and Kristinestad as well as shifting the position of Helsinki.

The Great Northern War (1700–21) and the occupation of Finland by Russia (known as the Great Wrath, 1713–21) led to vast areas of Sweden's territory being lost to Russia, though Finland itself remained part of Sweden. This led to a rethinking of Sweden's defence policies, including the creation of more fortification works in eastern Finland, but in particular the founding of the fortress town of Fredrikshamn (Hamina), with the first plan by Axel von Löwen in 1723. Von Löwen designed a Baroque octagonal "Ideal City" plan, modelled on similar fortress towns in central Europe - though in terms of shape and street pattern it was similar to Palmanova in Italy. However, following the so-called Hat's War between Sweden and Russia in 1741–43, which Sweden again lost, a large area of eastern Finland was ceded to Russia, including Hamina and the fortified towns of Lappeenranta and Savonlinna. The focus of the country's defences then switched to a small provincial coastal town, Helsinki. However, even during Russia's rule of Hamina, the grandeur of its neoclassical architecture continued to grow; and when the town was "returned" to Finland, as all of Finland was ceded to the Russian Empire and the Grand Duchy of Finland was established in 1809, the refined architecture was continued further, with several buildings designed by Carl Ludvig Engel designed in the then prevailing neoclassical style.

Helsinki had been founded as a trading town by Gustav I in 1550 as the town of Helsingfors, which he intended to be a rival to the Hanseatic city of Reval (today known as Tallinn), directly south across the Gulf of Finland. The siting proved unfavourable and the town remained small and insignificant, and it was plagued by poverty and diseases. The site was changed in 1640. But even with a new grid town plan the architecture of the town remained modest, mainly single-storey buildings. However, the development in Helsinki's architecture came after 1748 with the construction of the Sveaborg fortress - nowadays a World Heritage Site - (first planned by Augustin Ehrensvärd) on a group of islands just off the coast from Helsinki; the heart of the fortress was a dockyard, but distinct Baroque architecture as well as an English-style landscape park were placed within the otherwise unsymmetrical fortification system, all built in stone and brick, and many of the "windows" in the classical facade compositions were in fact painted on. The architecture of the buildings was in a restrained Rococo classicism named after the influential Swedish architect Carl Hårleman(1700-1753). Hårleman had been responsible for completing the Royal Palace in Stockholm, begun by Nicodemus Tessin the Younger, but he himself was also responsible for the design of the grand entrance to the Sveaborg fortress, the so-called King's Gate and may well have had an input, too, in the design of other key residential buildings there.

The height of Sweden's political expansion was marked by the instigation by the crown of the publication Erik Dahlbergh's Suecia Antiqua et Hodierna (Ancient and Modern Sweden), published 1660–1716, containing over 400 carefully prepared engravings illustrating the monuments of the kingdom of Sweden. However, only 9 featured Finland, the towns of Torneå and Vyborg, and a few castles, but mostly coats of arms of the Finnish counties, and depicting them as wilderness areas, or as in the case of the image for "South Finland", a craftsman carving a classical column in a wilderness. By 1721 Sweden's reign as a great power was over, and Russia now dominated the north. The war-weary Swedish parliament, the Riksdag, asserted new powers and reduced the crown to a constitutional monarch, with power held by a civilian government controlled by the Riksdag, albeit by 1772 Gustav III had imposed an absolute monarchy, and by 1788 Sweden and Russia would again be at war in the Russo-Swedish War (1788–1790). But before the war, the so-called new "Age of Freedom" (1719-1772) opened, and the Swedish economy was rebuilt. Advances in the natural sciences put culture in a new perspective; for instance, building techniques improved, the use of the wood-burning cocklestove and glass windows became more common. Also the design of fortifications (often combined with ideas about town planning and architectural design) was at the cutting-edge of warfare technology, with fortifications officers travelling to central Europe to follow new precedents. From 1776 onward, the drawings of all public buildings had to be sent for building approval and review in Stockholm, and new statutes were introduced to prevent fires, so typical for wooden towns. Attempts at achieving a uniformity in architecture was furthered by the introduction of standard "model plans". These were first introduced with the restructuring of the army by Charles XI already in 1682, whereby each of the lands of Sweden were to have 1200 soldiers at disposal, at all times, and two farms were to provide accommodations for one soldier. The "model plans" for military quarters, showing detailed facades and a scale, were designed in a classical Hårleman Rococo style or "Palladian" style, and these in turn affected vernacular architecture, in much the same way as the "model drawings" of the 16th century treatise by Palladio, I quattro libri dell'architettura, influenced the following generations throughout Europe and in the colonies. Among the most influential "pattern books" containing the model drawings were those made up by Swedish fortifications officer Carl Wijnblad (1702-1768), published in 1755, 1756 and 1766, which were spread widely in Finland as well as in Sweden. A particular significant example is the commandant's house in the "castle courtyard" at the heart of the Sveaborg fortress off Helsinki.

Compared to the rest of Europe, the manor houses of Finland are extremely modest in size and architectural refinement. Strictly speaking, a manor house was a gift from the Swedish king, and enjoyed tax privileges. Later manors, stemmed from military officer houses and mansions from privately owned ironworks. The oldest surviving stone manor houses date from the Vasa period in the 16th century; good examples are the manors of Kankainen (founded 1410s) and Vuorentaka (late 1400s), both near Turku. Also in south-west Finland, Louhisaari manor house, completed in 1655 (unknown architect, though probably designed by its builder-owner Herman Klasson Fleming) is a rare example in Finland of a Palladian-style country house. The construction of manor houses in Finland raises the name of an early foreign architect in Finland; Prussian-born Christian Friedrich Schröder (1722-1789) was by training a mason and who worked in Stockholm before moving to Turku in 1756 and was appointed city architect in 1756 - which included responsibility for training assistants. Among his works in Turku, was the rebuilding of the tower of Turku Cathedral Designing in the Rococo and French classical styles, albeit in a more modest idiom, Schröder designed the manor houses of Lapila (1763), Paddais (mid 1760s), Nuhjala (1764), Ala-Lemu (1767), Teijo (1770) and Fagervik (1773), as well as the Rauma town hall (1776).

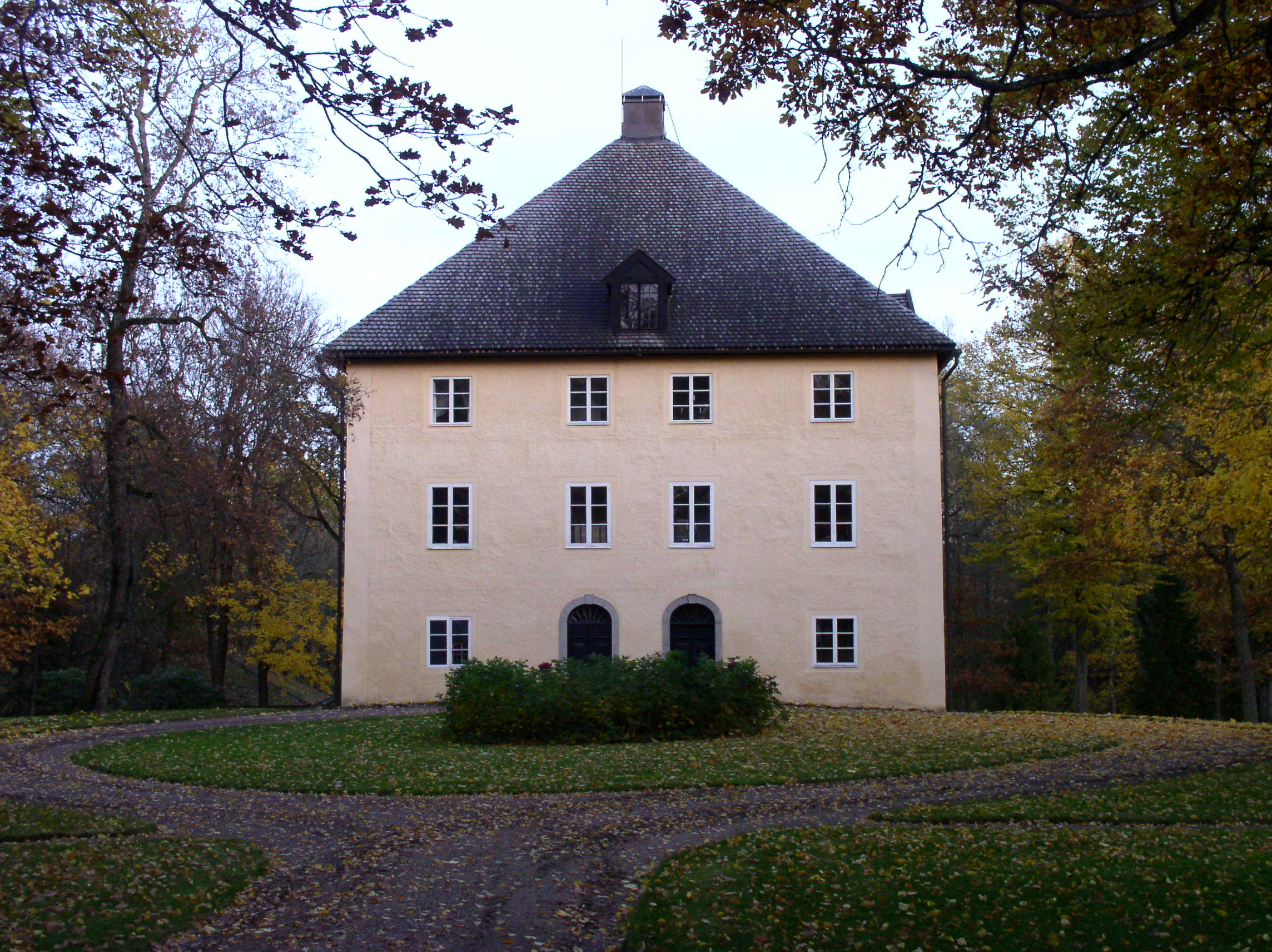
Kankainen Manor, Henrik Klasson Horn (c. 1550), Augustin Ehrensvärd (c.1756), Claes Aminoff (1935).

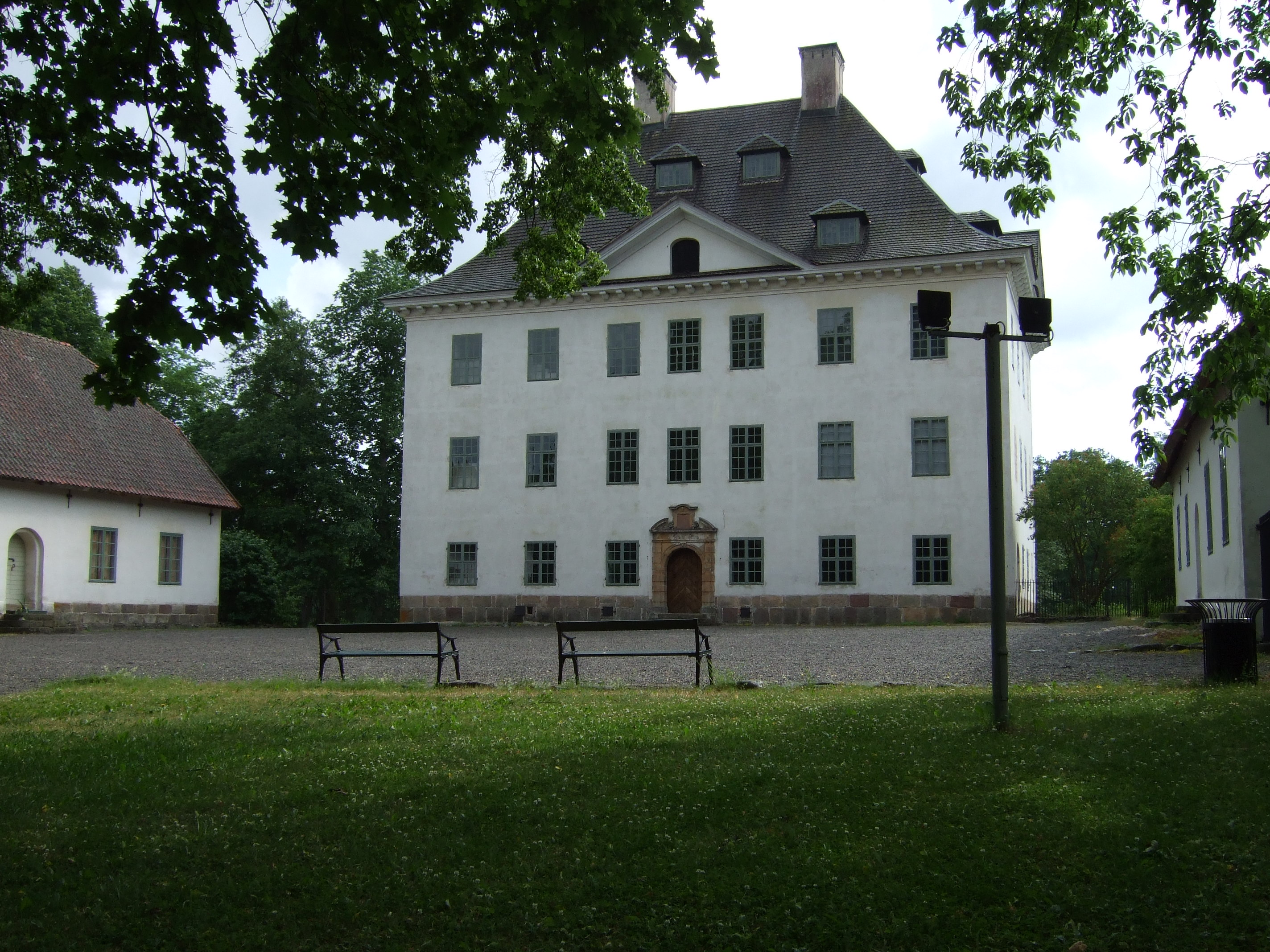
Louhisaari manor house, 1655.

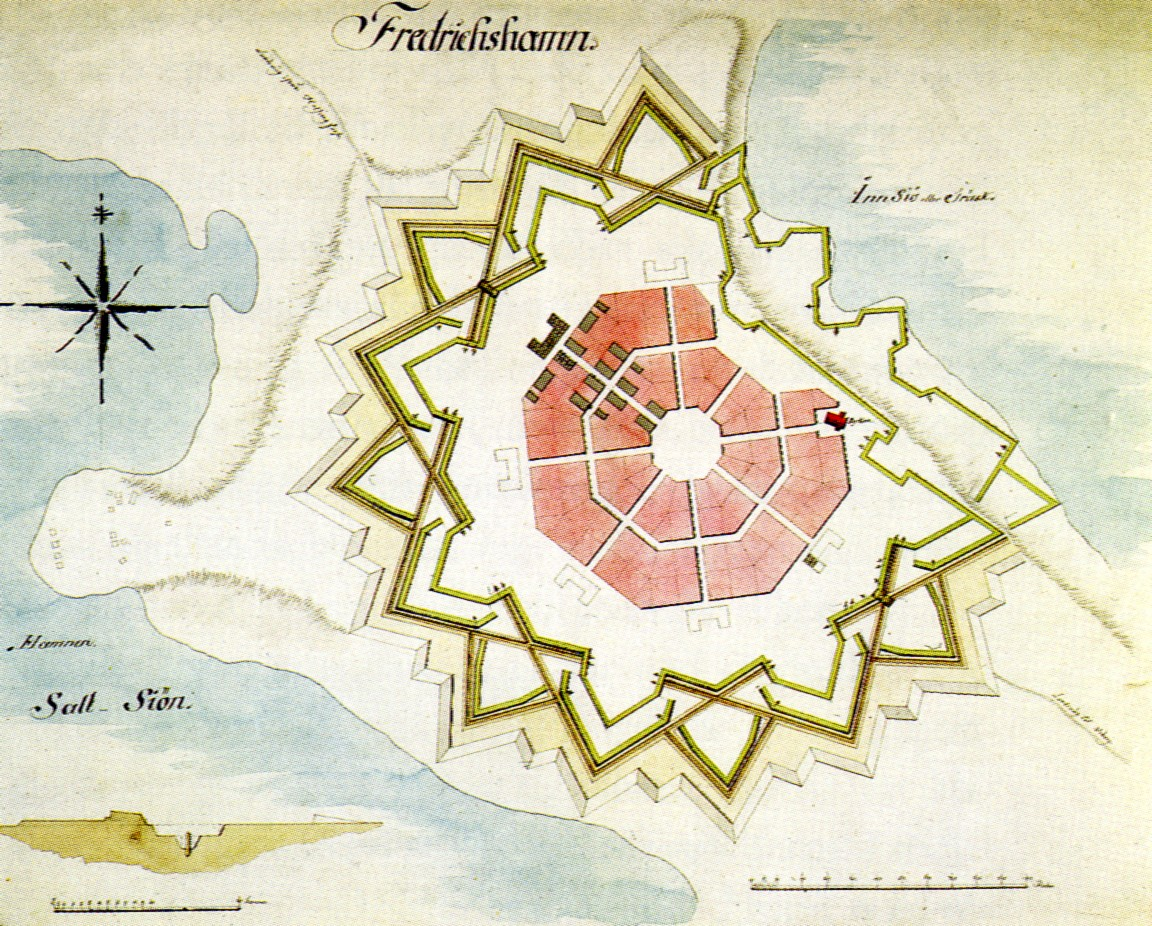
Fredrikshamn (Hamina), fortress-town plan, Axel von Löwen, 1723.

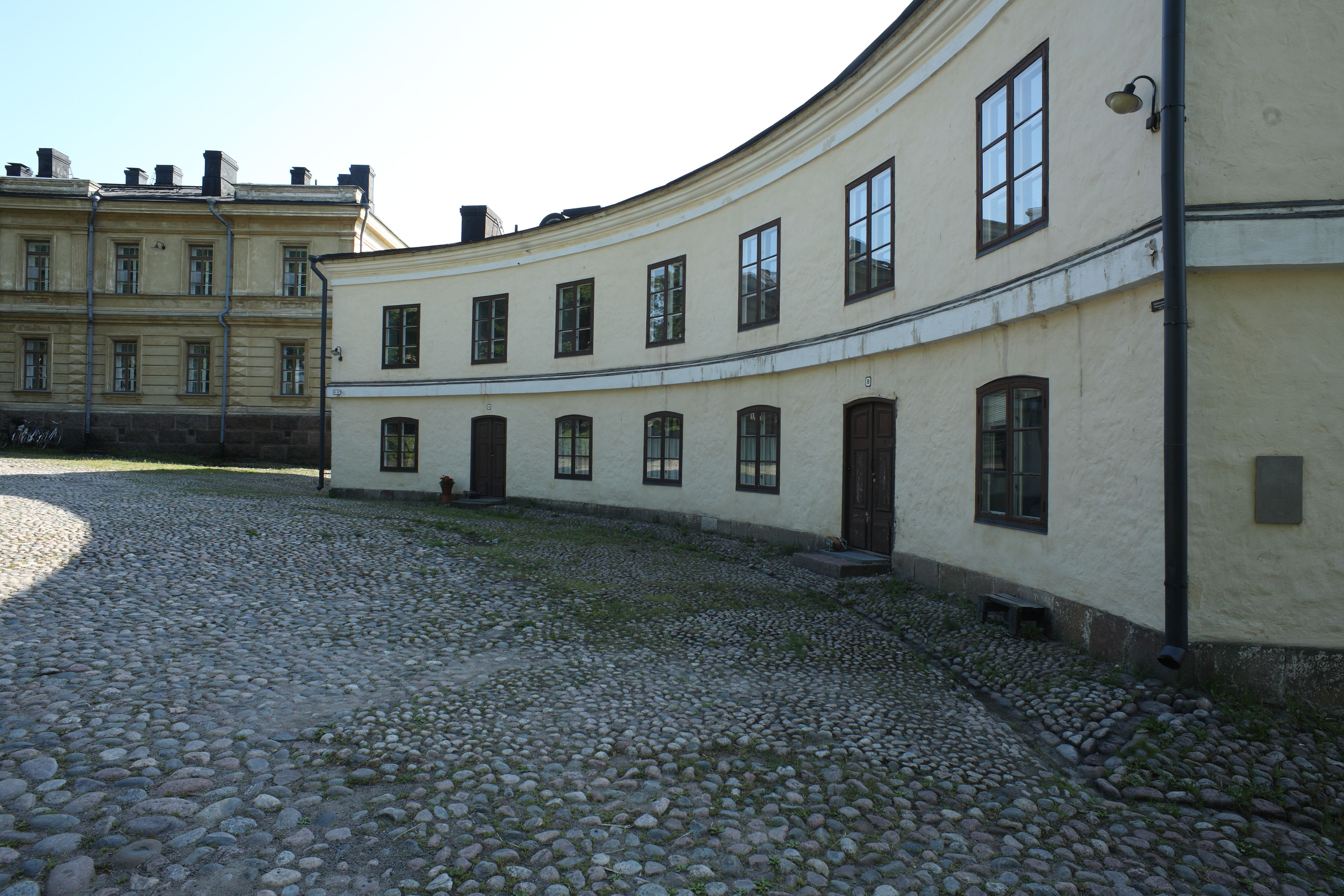
Castle courtyard, Sveaborg fortress, Helsinki, after Carl Wijnblad, 1747.

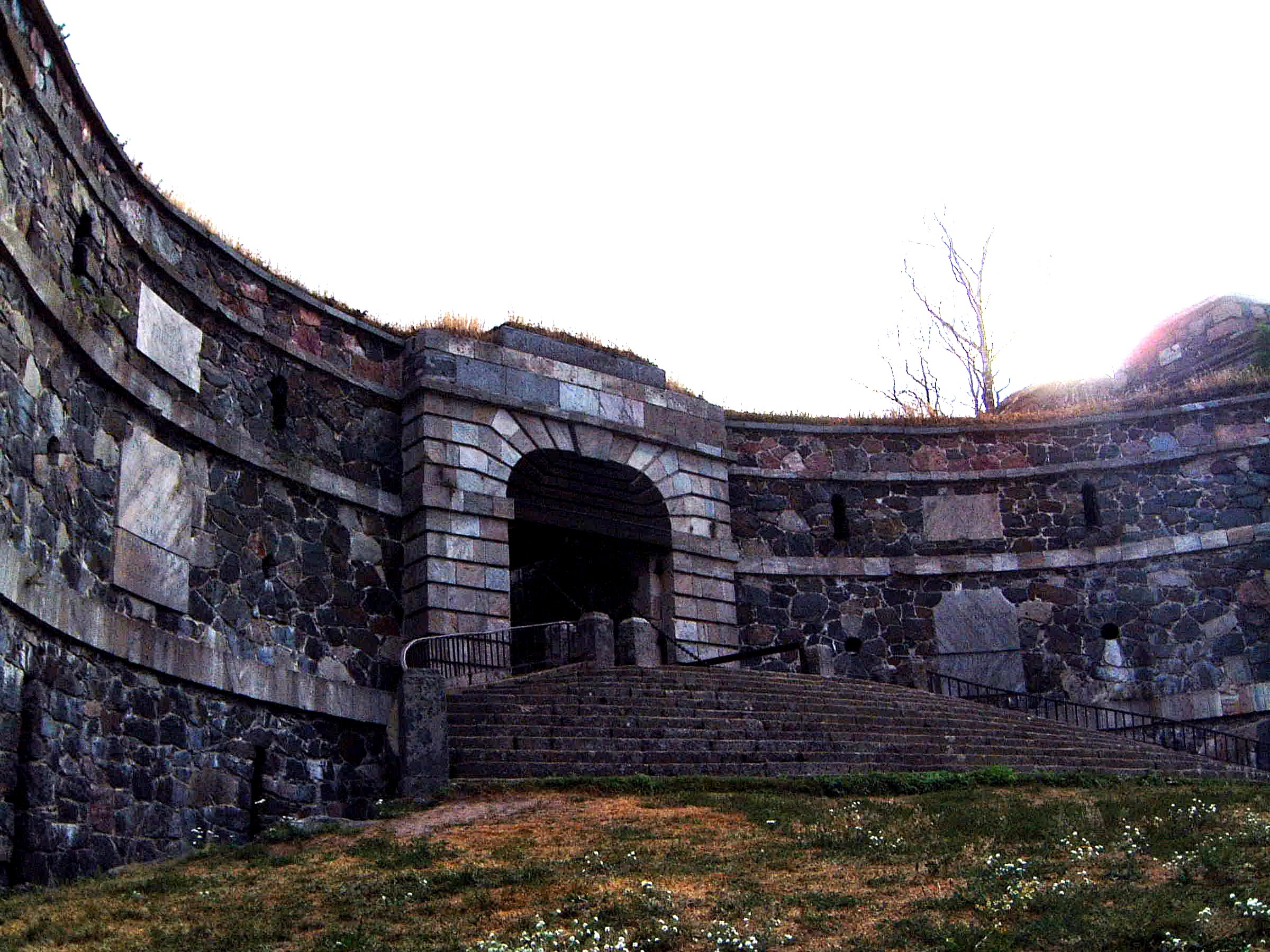
The King's Gate, Sveaborg fortress, Helsinki, Carl Hårleman, 1747.

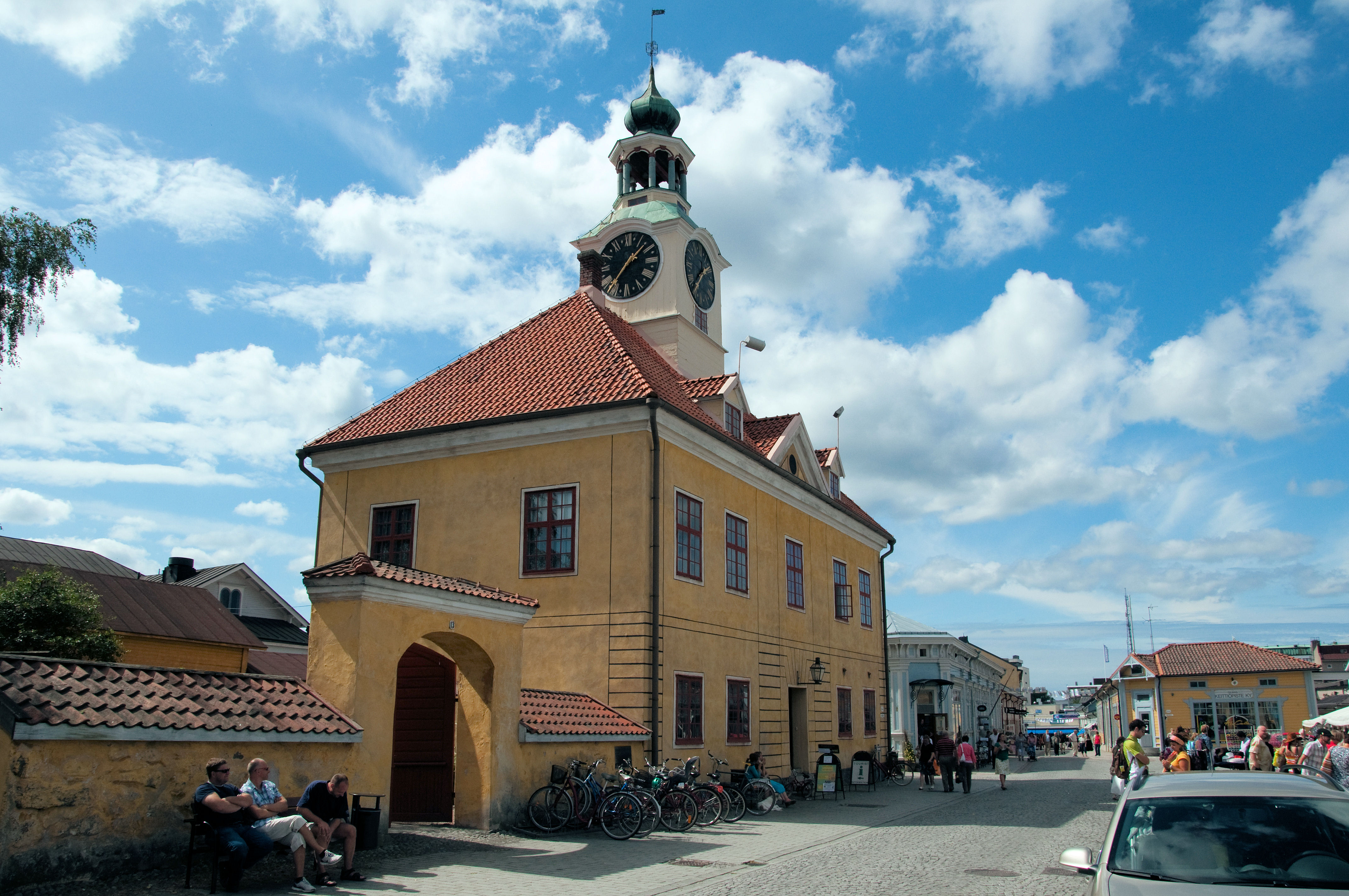
Rauma Town Hall, Christian Friedrich Schröder, 1776.

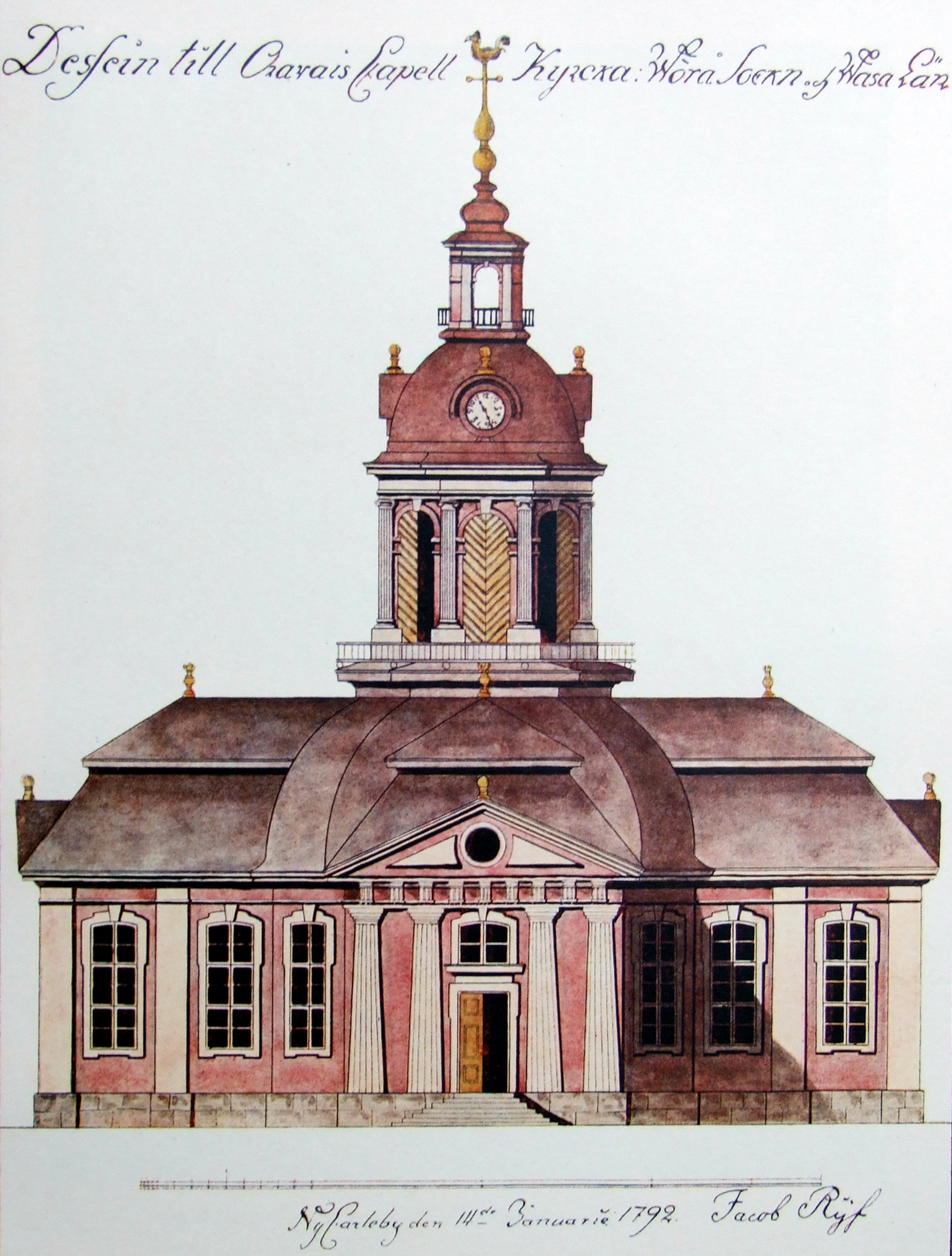
Oravais church, Jacob Rijf, 1792.

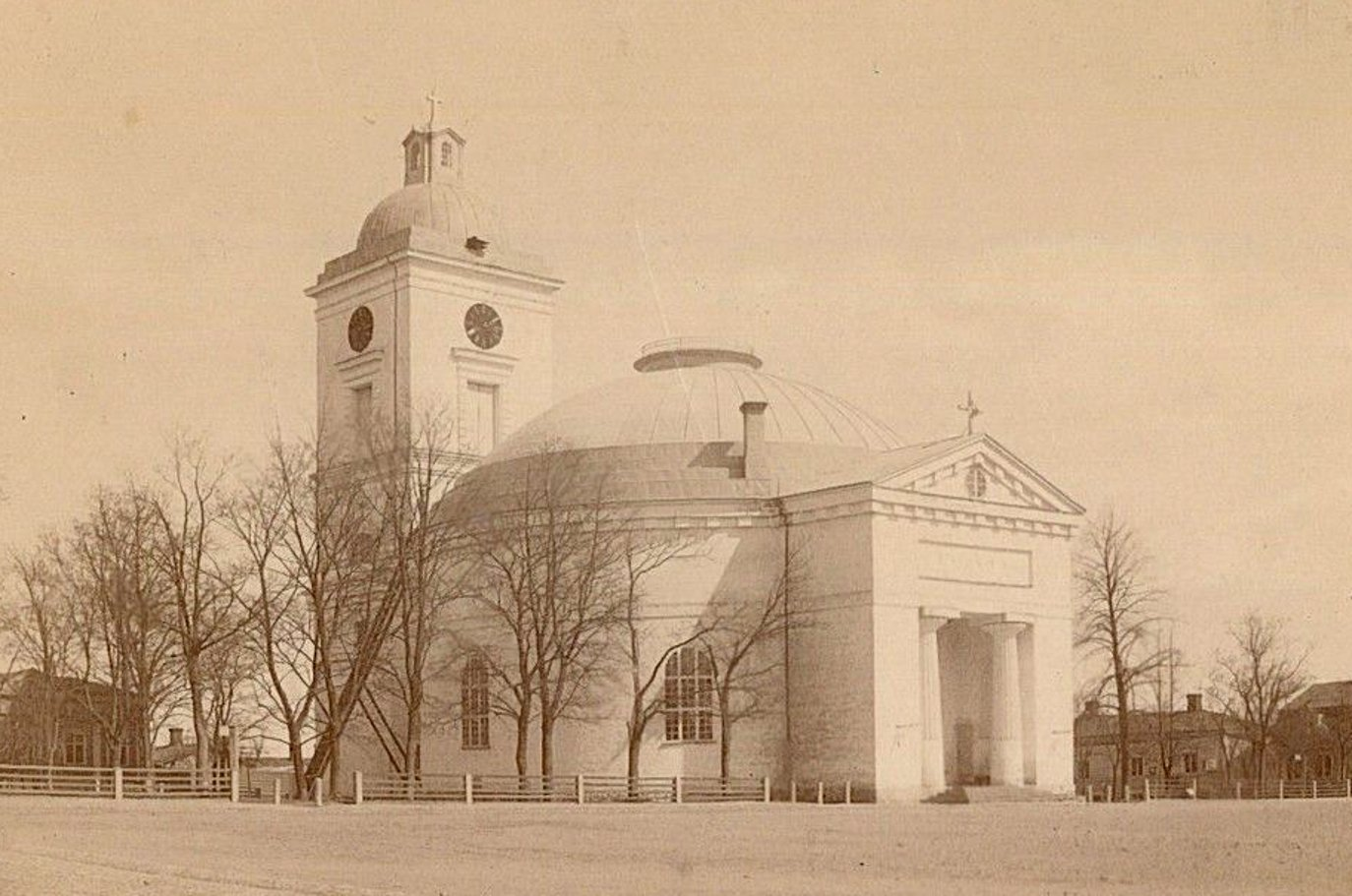
Hämeenlinna Church, Louis Jean Desprez, 1799.

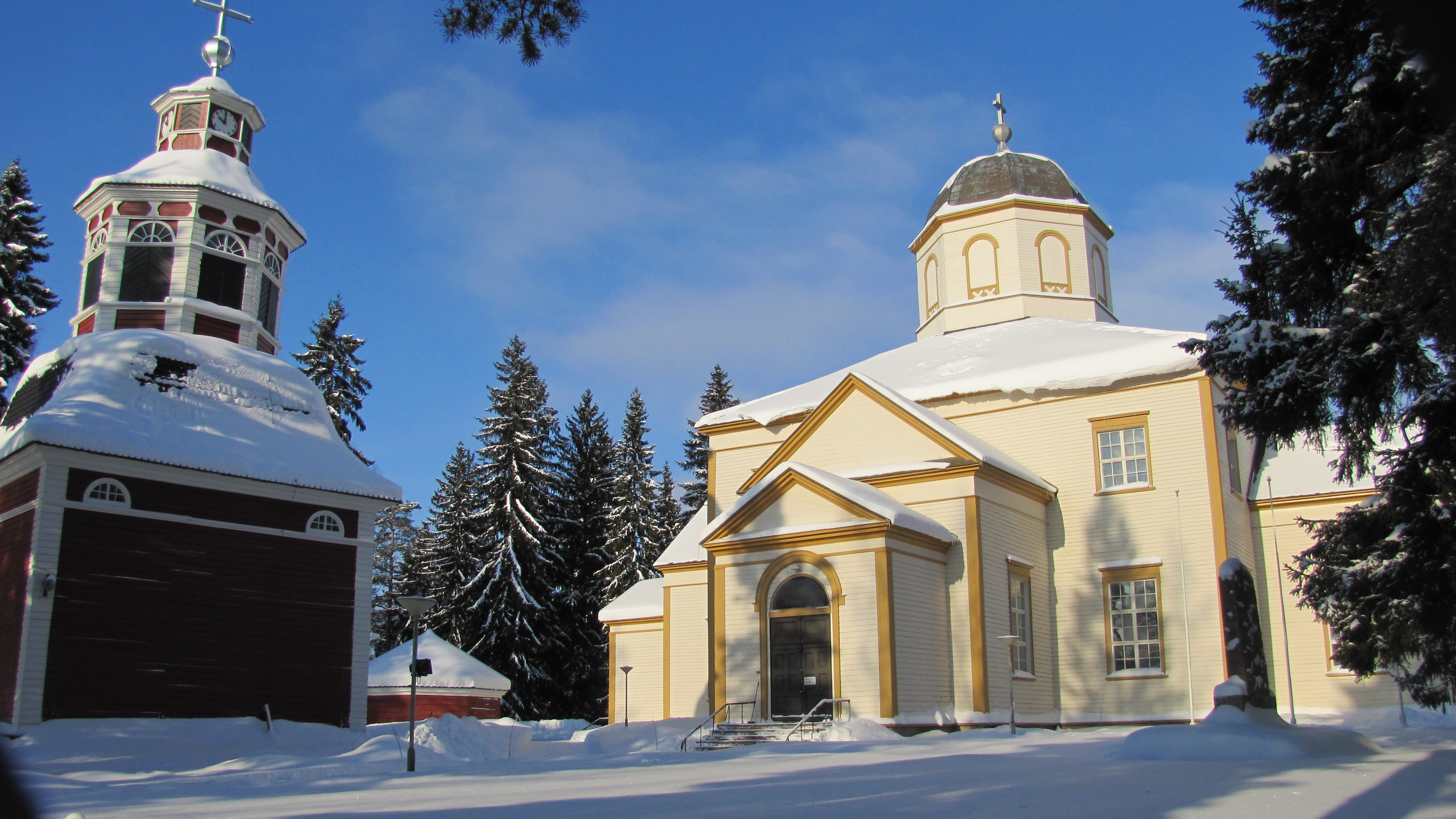
Sulkava church, Charles Bassi, 1822.

== Grand Duchy period, 1809–1917 ==
=== Early Grand Duchy period: Neoclassicism and Gothic revival ===
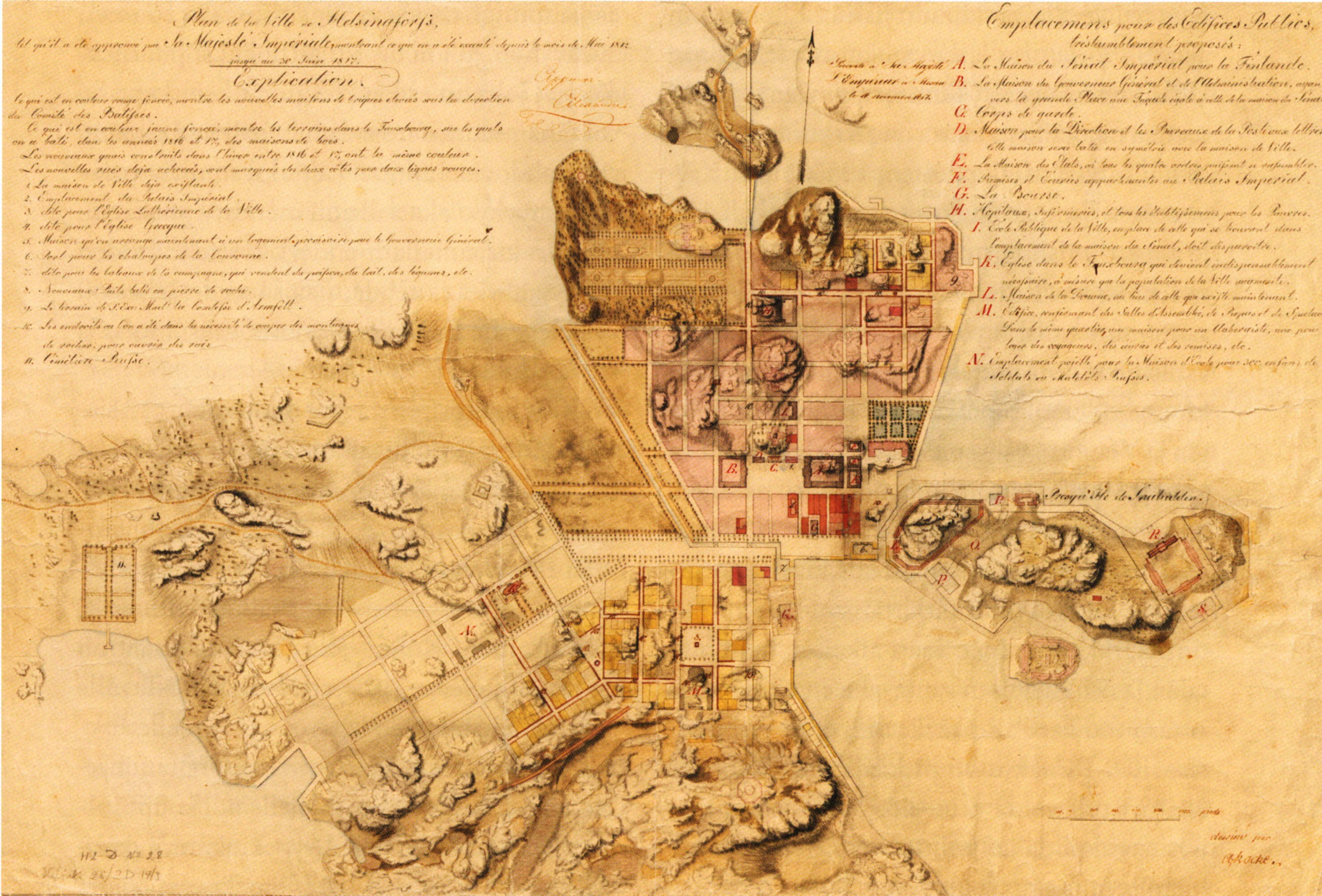
Johan Albrecht Ehrenström, final city plan for Helsinki (1817).

The cornerstone of Finland as a state was laid in 1809 at the Diet of Porvoo, where Czar Alexander I proclaimed himself constitutional ruler of the new Grand Duchy of Finland and promised to maintain the faith and laws of the land. The creation of a capital was a clear indication of the Czar's will to make the new Grand Duchy a functioning entity. On April 8, 1812, Alexander I declared Helsinki the capital of the Grand Duchy of Finland. At that time Helsinki was only a small wooden town of about 4000 inhabitants, albeit with huge island fortress of Sveaborg and its military garrison nearby. The czar appointed the military engineer Johan Albrecht Ehrenström, a former courtier of Sweden's King Gustavus III, as head of the reconstruction committee, with the task of drawing up a plan for a new stone-built capital. The heart of the scheme was the Senate Square, surrounded by Neoclassical buildings for the state, church and university. In the words of art historian Riitta Nikula, Ehrenström created "the symbolic heart of the Grand Duchy of Finland, where all the main institutions had an exact place dictated by their function in the hierarchy."

In fact, even before the ceding of Finland to Russia in 1809, the advent of Neoclassicism in the mid-18th century arrived with French artist-architect Louis Jean Desprez, who was employed by the Swedish state, and who designed Hämeenlinna church in 1799. Charles (Carlo) Bassi was another foreigner, an Italian-born architect also employed by the Swedish state, who worked especially in the design of churches. Bassi immigrated to Finland and became the first formally skilled architect to settle permanently in Finland. In 1810 Bassi was appointed the first head of the National Board of Building (Rakennushallitus - a government post that remained until 1995), based in Turku, a position he held until 1824. Bassi remained in Finland after power over the country was ceded to Russia. In 1824 his official position as head of the National Board of Building was taken by another immigrant architect, German-born Carl Ludvig Engel.

With the move of the Finnish capital from Turku to Helsinki, Engel had been appointed by Czar Alexander I to design the major new public buildings to be fitted into Ehrenström's town plan: these included the major buildings around the Senate Square; the Senate church, Helsinki University buildings - including Engel's finest interior, Helsinki University Library (1836–45) - and Government buildings. All these buildings were inspired by the style of Russian Empire's capital, St. Petersburg, namely Neoclassicism - making the surroundings of Helsinki Senate Square somehow similar to St. Petersburg, and indeed Ehrenström's plan had even originally included a canal, mimicking a cityscape feature of the former.

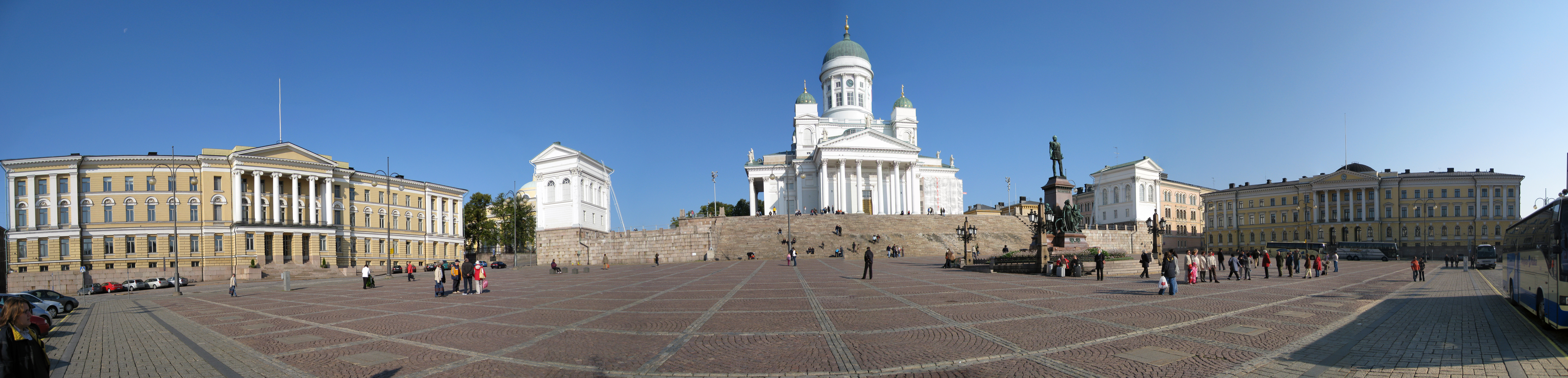
Helsinki Senate Square, designed by Carl Ludwig Engel. From the left: Helsinki University main building, Senate Church, Palace of the Council of State

In addition to his work in Helsinki, Engel was also appointed "state intendant" with responsibility for the design and supervision of construction of the vast majority of state buildings throughout the country, including tens of church designs, as well as the design and laying out of town plans. Among these works were Helsinki Naval Barracks (1816–38), Helsinki Old Church (1826), Lapua Church (1827), Kärsämäki Church (1828), Pori Town Hall (1831), Hamina Church (1843), Wiurila manor house (1845).

Engel had in his possession a copy of Andrea Palladio's architectural treatise I quattro libri dell'architettura, and Engel scholars have often stressed Engels' indebtedness to Palladian theory. But Engel also kept up correspondence with colleagues from Germany and followed trends there. Engel's relationship with key Prussian architect Karl Friedrich Schinkel, three years his senior and both having studied at the Bauakademie in Berlin, has yet to be properly verified. The influences from central Europe would also take on board a more formulaic process, typified by standardisations of design formulas in post-revolutionary France by Jean-Nicolas-Louis Durand, for instance by the use of design grids.

Some of Engel's later works are also characterised by the turn in central Europe to Gothic Revival architecture, with an emphasis on red brick facades typical for central Europe. The German Church (1864) is typical of that period, though designed by another two itinerant architects, the German Harald Julius von Bosse (who had worked much in St. Petersburg) and the Swedish-born Carl Johan von Heideken. In addition to churches, the neo-Gothic style was also dominant for the buildings of the growing industrial manufacturers, including the Verla mill in Jaala (1892) - nowadays a World Heritage Site - designed by Edward Dippel. The emergence of various revivalist styles throughout Europe - in the search for a new "national style" - was also felt in Finland, but would not flourish until the advent of Jugendstil at the end of the century; an argument is even made for the influence in Finland of the neo-Romanesque or Rundbogenstil from Germany, particularly associated with Heinrich Hübsch. For example, certain Rundbogenstil features have been noted in Kerimäki Church (1847) - the world's largest wooden church - designed by Adolf Fredrik Granstedt, but with considerable input from the master builders for the project Axel Tolpo and his son Th. J. Tolpo.

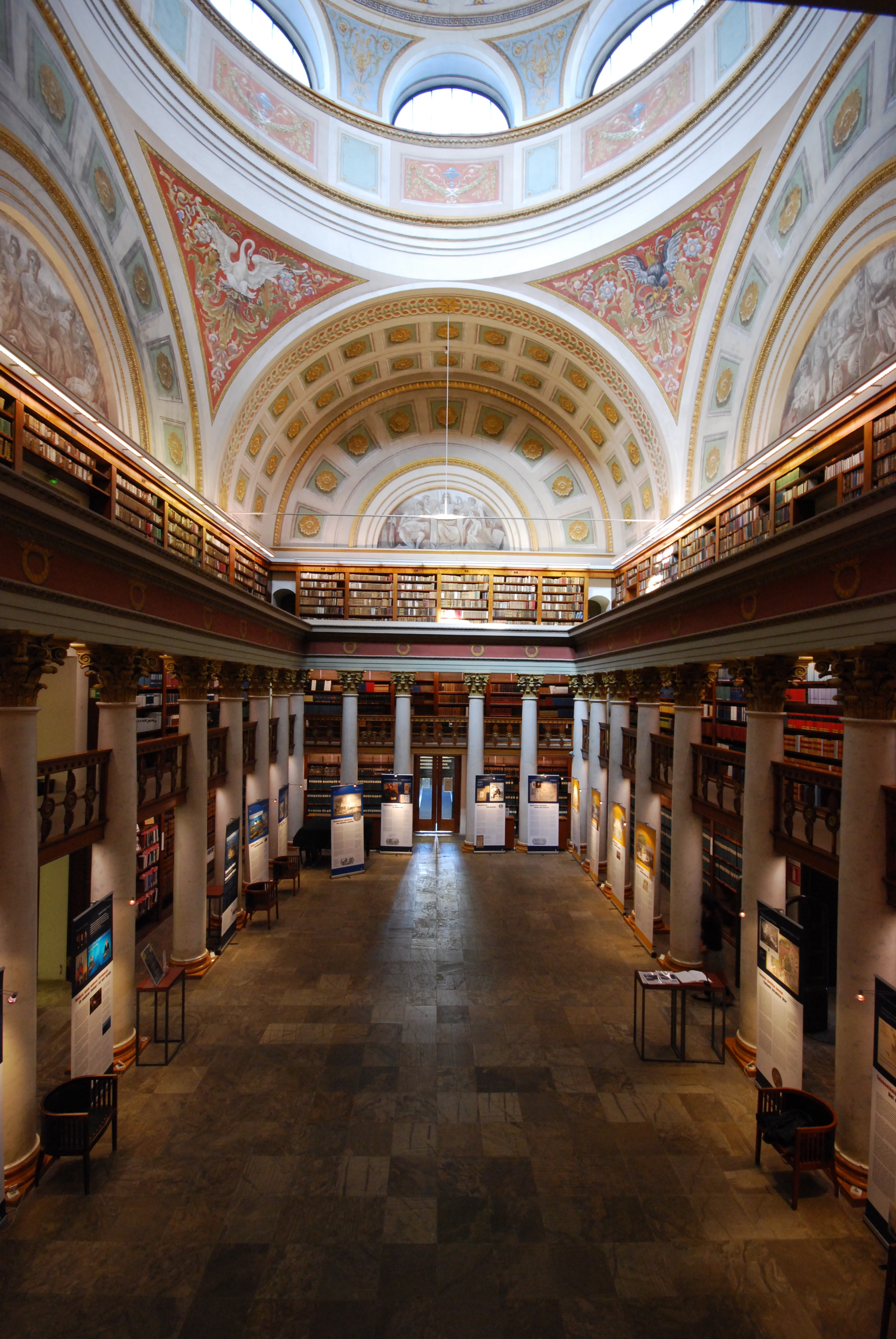
C.L. Engel, Helsinki University Library (1845).

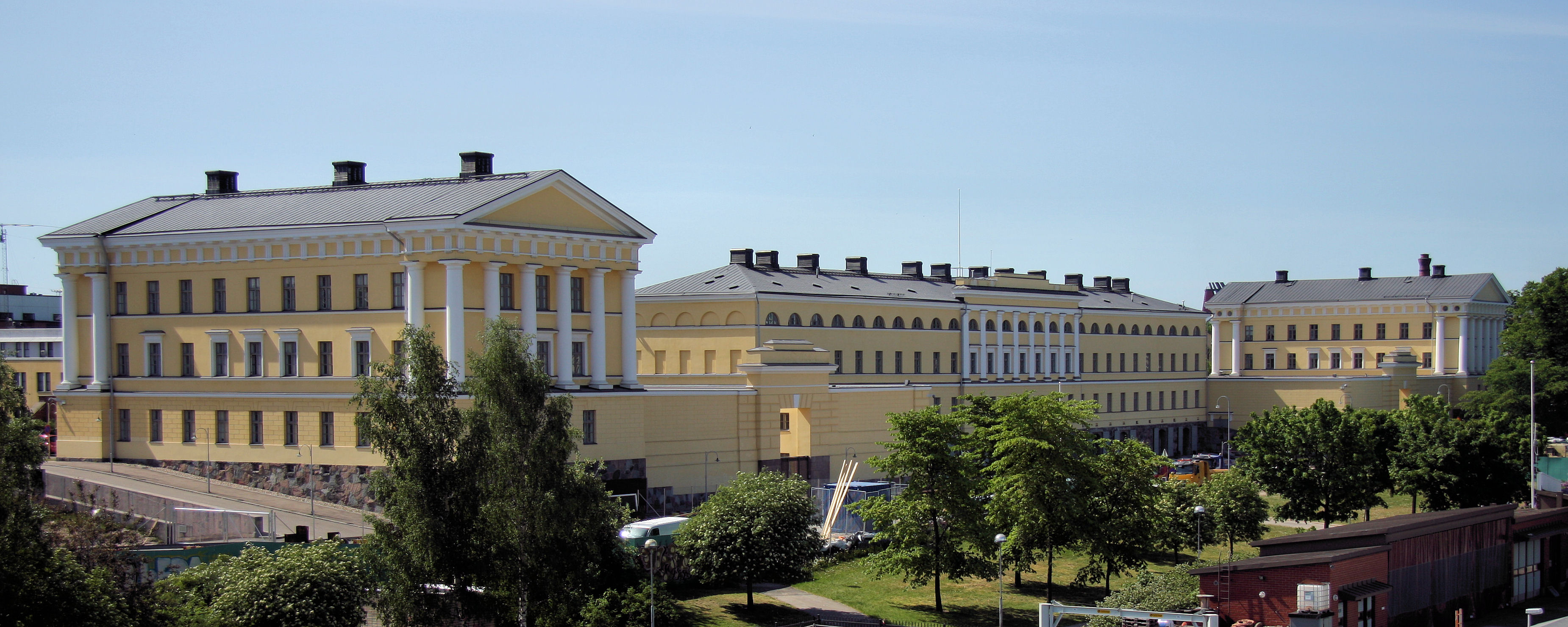
C.L. Engel, Helsinki Naval Barracks, (1816–38).

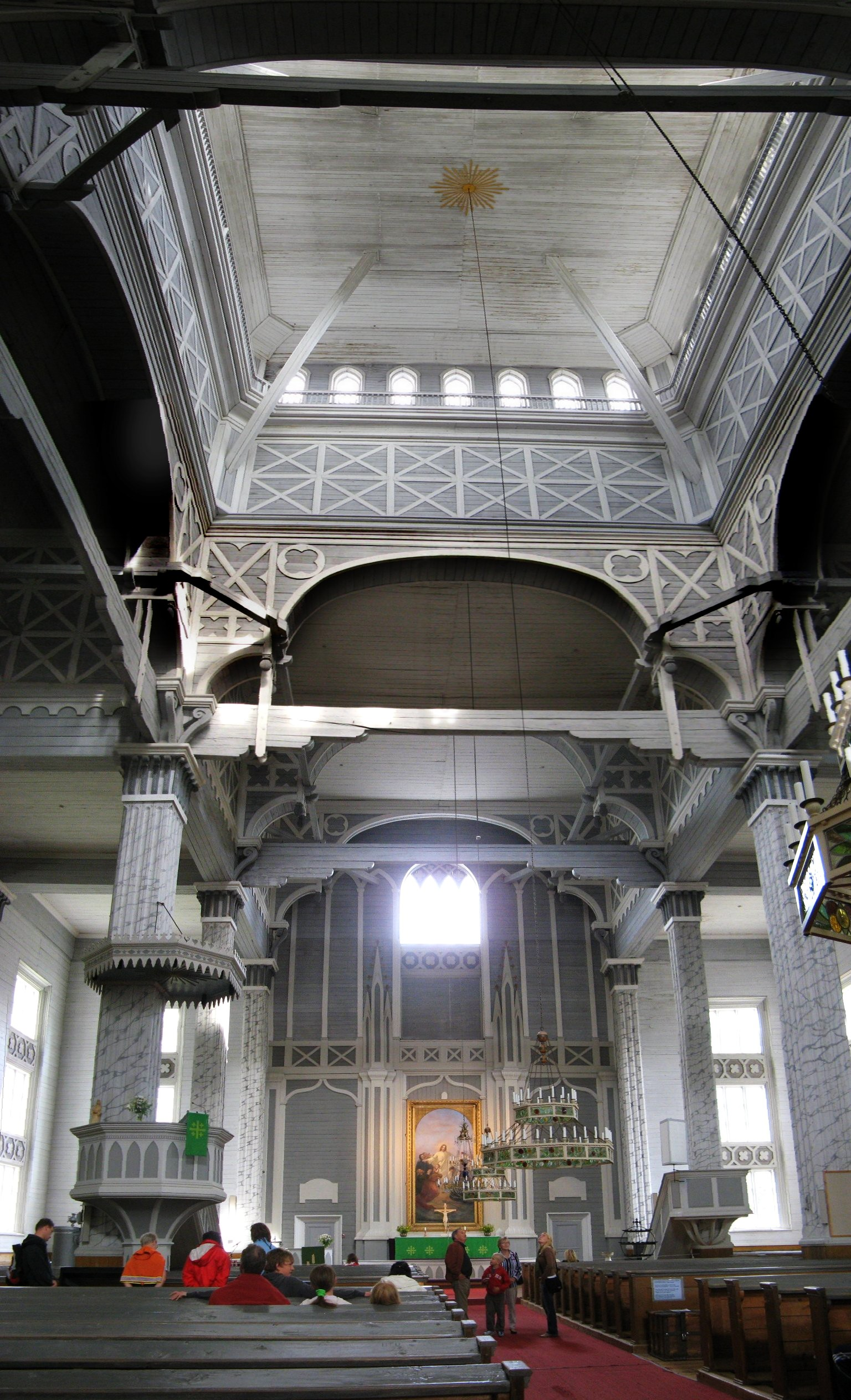
Adolf Fredrik Granstedt, Kerimäki Church (1847).

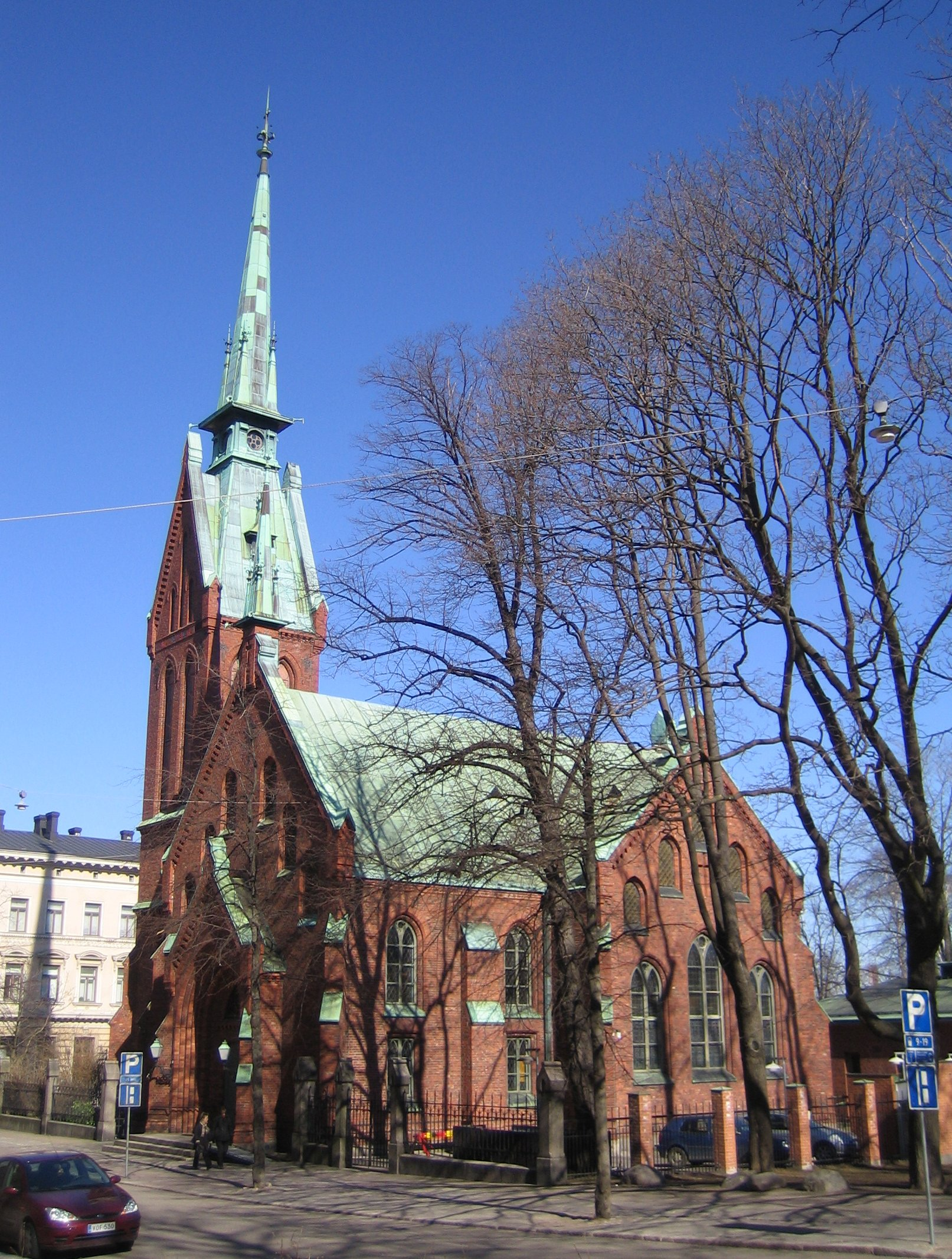
Harald Julius von Bosse and Carl Johan von Heideken, German Church, Helsinki (1864).

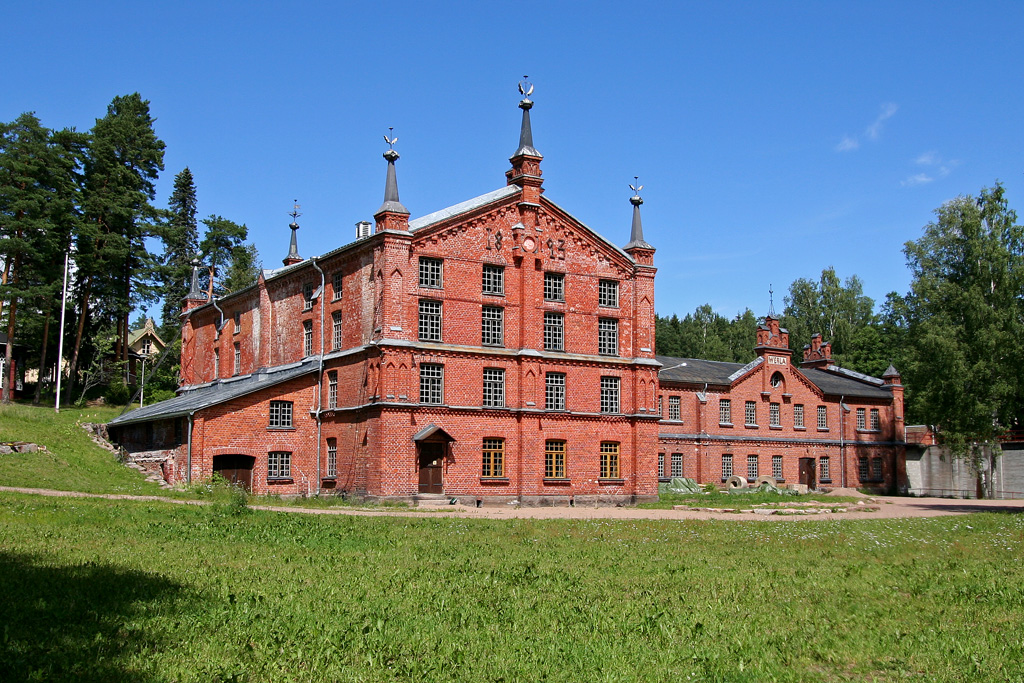
Edward Dippel, Verla paper mill, Jaala (1893)

The eclectic mixtures of neo-Gothic, neo-Romanesque, neo-Classical and neo-Renaissance architecture continued even during the beginning of the 20th century, with architects using different styles for different projects or even combining elements in the same work. The Turku Main Library, by Karl August Wrede, completed in 1903, was designed in a Dutch late Renaissance style imitating the House of Nobility of 1660 designed by French architect Simon De la Vallée. Swedish architect Georg Theodor von Chiewitz had a fairly successful career in his home country before arriving in Finland in 1851, fleeing a prison sentence in Sweden following bankruptcy, and soon established a career for himself, being named county architect for Turku and Pori in 1852. Among his varied works, he designed new baroque-style town plans for the towns of Pori (1852), Mariehamn (Åland) (1859) and Uusikaupunki (1856), an English-style romantic landscape park for Seinäjoki (1858), neo-gothic churches for Lovisa (1865) and Uusikaupunki (1864), Rundbogenstil-neo-Gothic Lovisa town hall and the House of Nobility in Helsinki (1862), neo-Renaissance Nya Teatern, Helsinki (1853, burnt down 1863) as well as redbrick factory buildings in Littoinen, Turku, Forssa and Tampere and various rustic villas for private clients. A similar eclecticism was continued most successfully by one of Chiewitz's employees, Theodor Höijer (1843-1910), who went on to establish one of the most commercially successful private architecture firms in Helsinki, designing tens of buildings mostly in Helsinki, schools, libraries and several apartment blocks. One of his most famous works, the redbrick Erottaja fire station, Helsinki (1891) is seen as a mixture of neo-Gothic and neo-Renaissance styles modelled on Giotto's Campanile in Florence and the tower of the medieval Palazzo Vecchio also in Florence.

However, the question of "stylistic revival" in Finland has another important cultural-political aspect, the presence of the Russian Empire through the building of Russian Orthodox churches in the second half of the 19th century - though what is regarded as the initiation of the deliberate politico-cultural policy of the Russification of Finland didn't take place until the reign of Czar Nicholas II, from 1899 onward. Initially, just as in the Russian capital, St. Petersburg, the Russian Orthodox churches were initially designed in the prevailing neoclassical style; however, the latter half of the 19th century also saw the emergence of a Russian Revival architecture and Byzantine Revival architecture - part of the interest in Russia as in Finland and elsewhere in Europe of exploring nationalism - with distinct "onion domes", tented roofs and rich decoration. Several such churches were built in Finland, the vast majority in the eastern half of the country, with notable examples in Tampere, Kuopio, Viinijärvi and Kouvola. An early example, the Suomenlinna church (1854) in the fortress off the coast of Helsinki, was designed by Moscow-based architect Konstantin Thon, the same architect who designed, among other key buildings, the Cathedral of Christ the Saviour, the Grand Kremlin Palace and the Kremlin Armoury in Moscow. The presence of the Orthodox church in the heart of Helsinki was made clear by the placement of the Uspenski Cathedral (1868) on a prominent hill overlooking the city; its architect, Aleksey Gornostayev was one of the pioneers of the Russian Revival architecture, credited with the rebirth of traditional tented roof architecture of northern Russia, which is also a prominent feature in the Uspenski Cathedral.

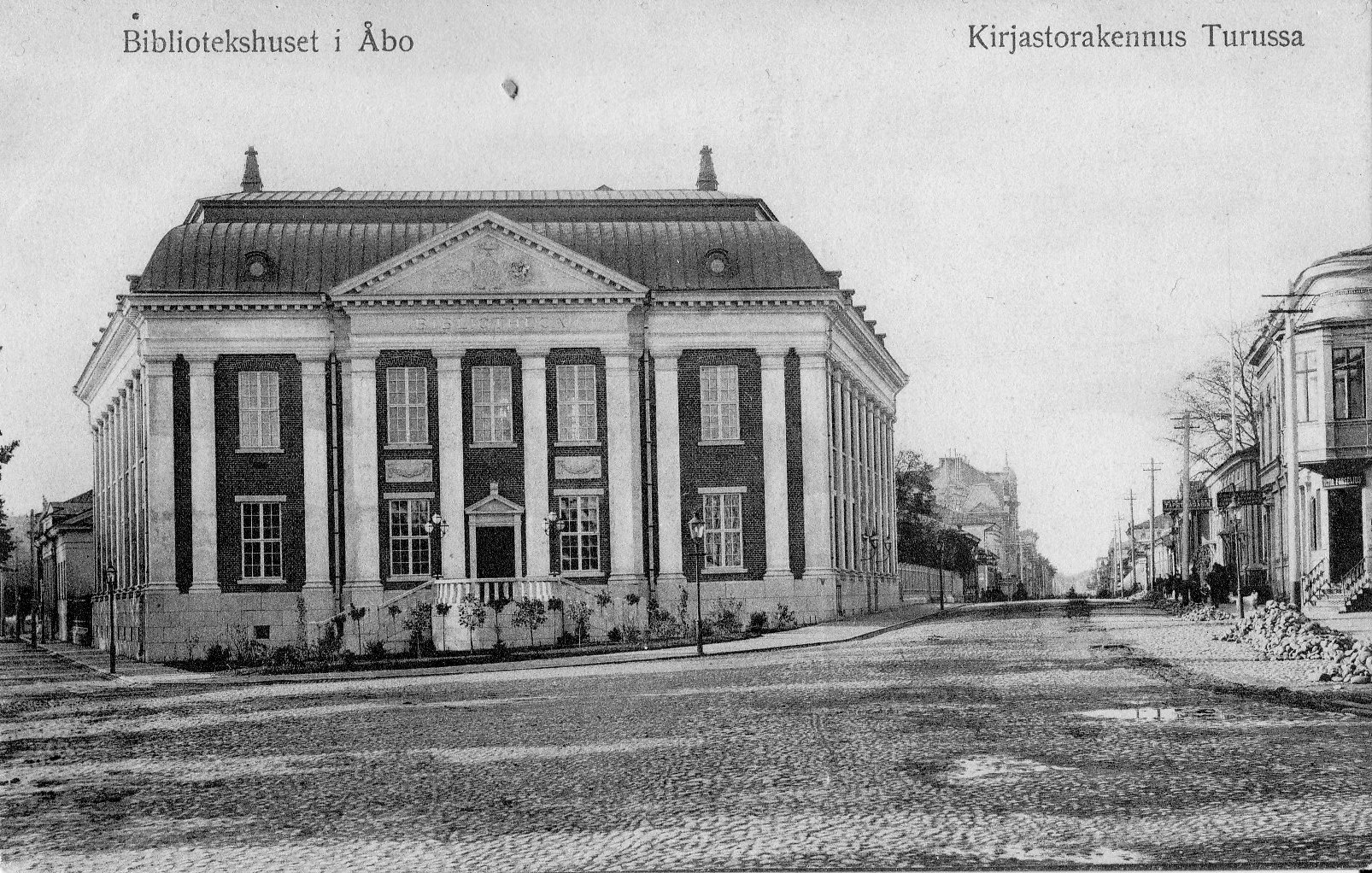
Karl August Wrede, Turku Main Library, 1903.

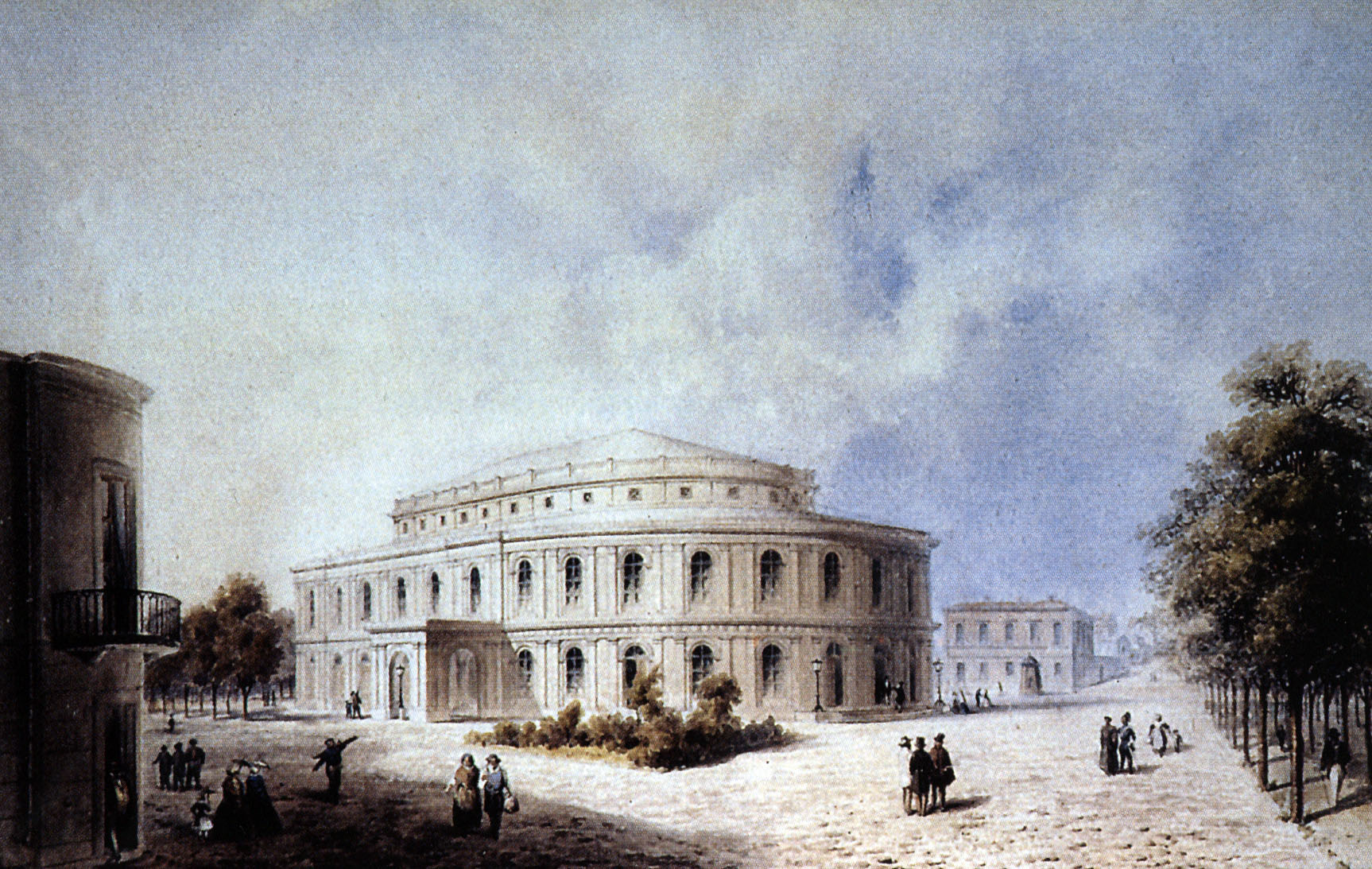
Georg Theodor von Chiewitz, Nya Teatern, Helsinki (1853).

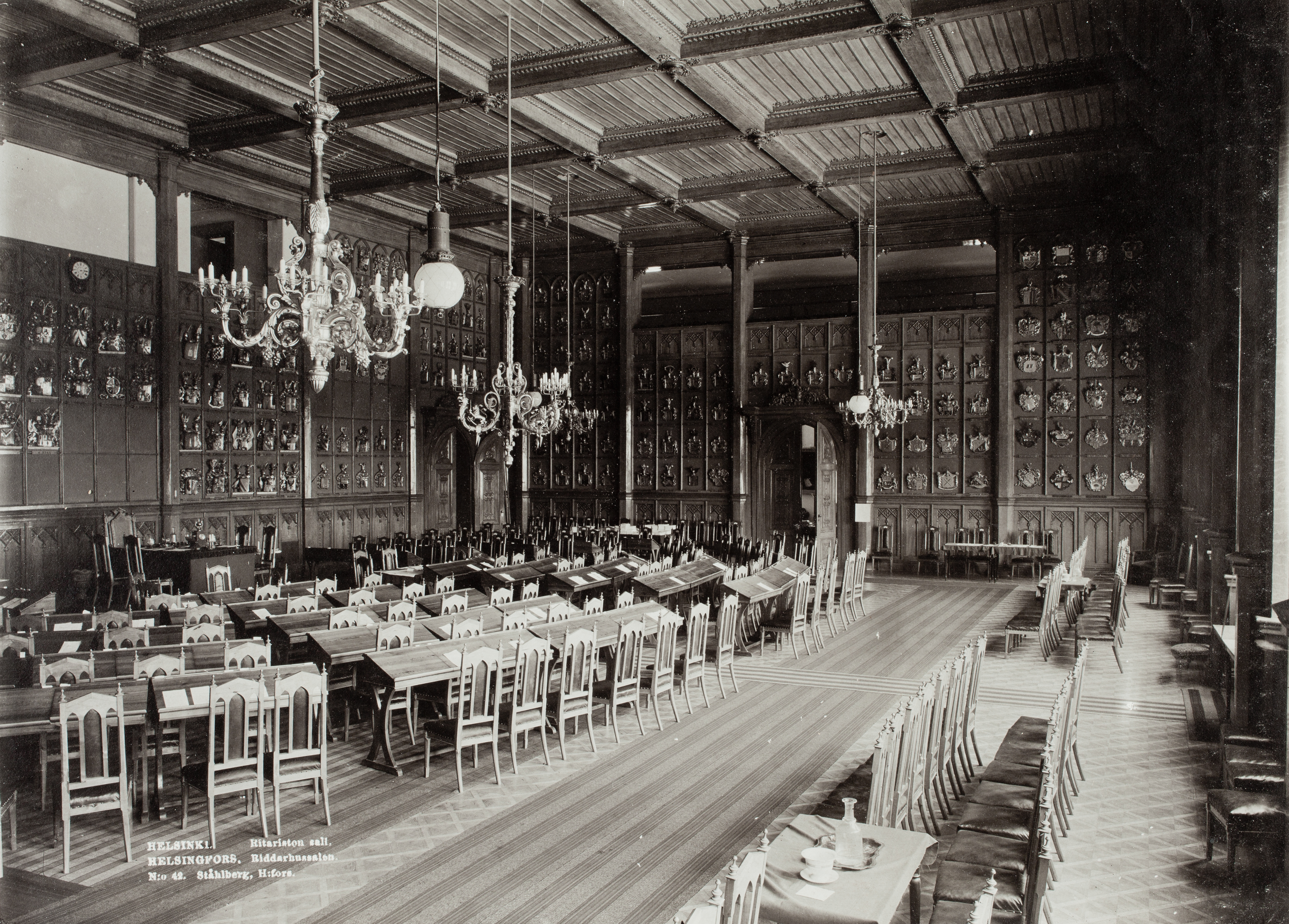
Georg Theodor von Chiewitz, House of Nobility, Helsinki (1862).

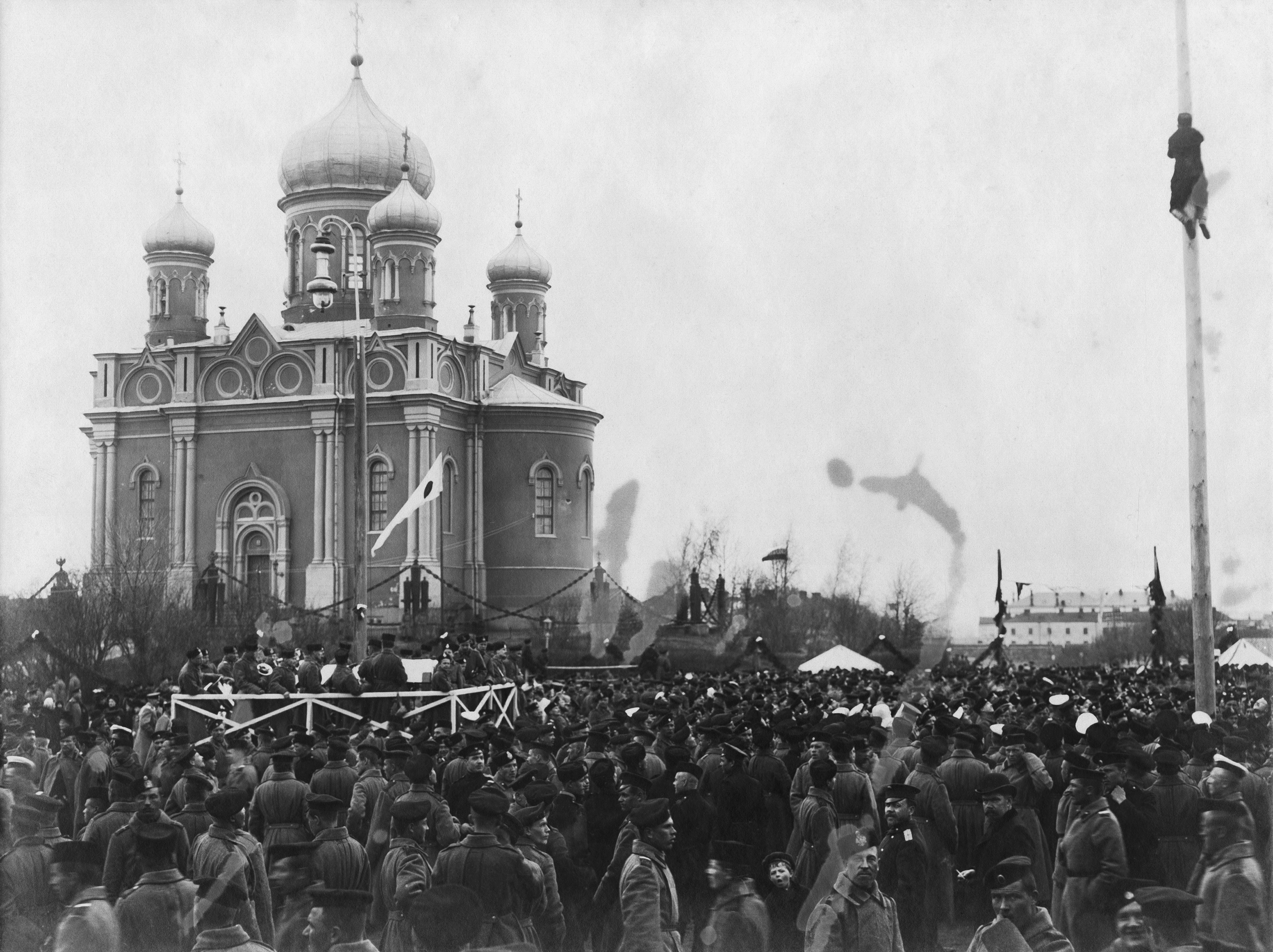
Konstantin Thon, Suomenlinna Church in 1908 (1854).

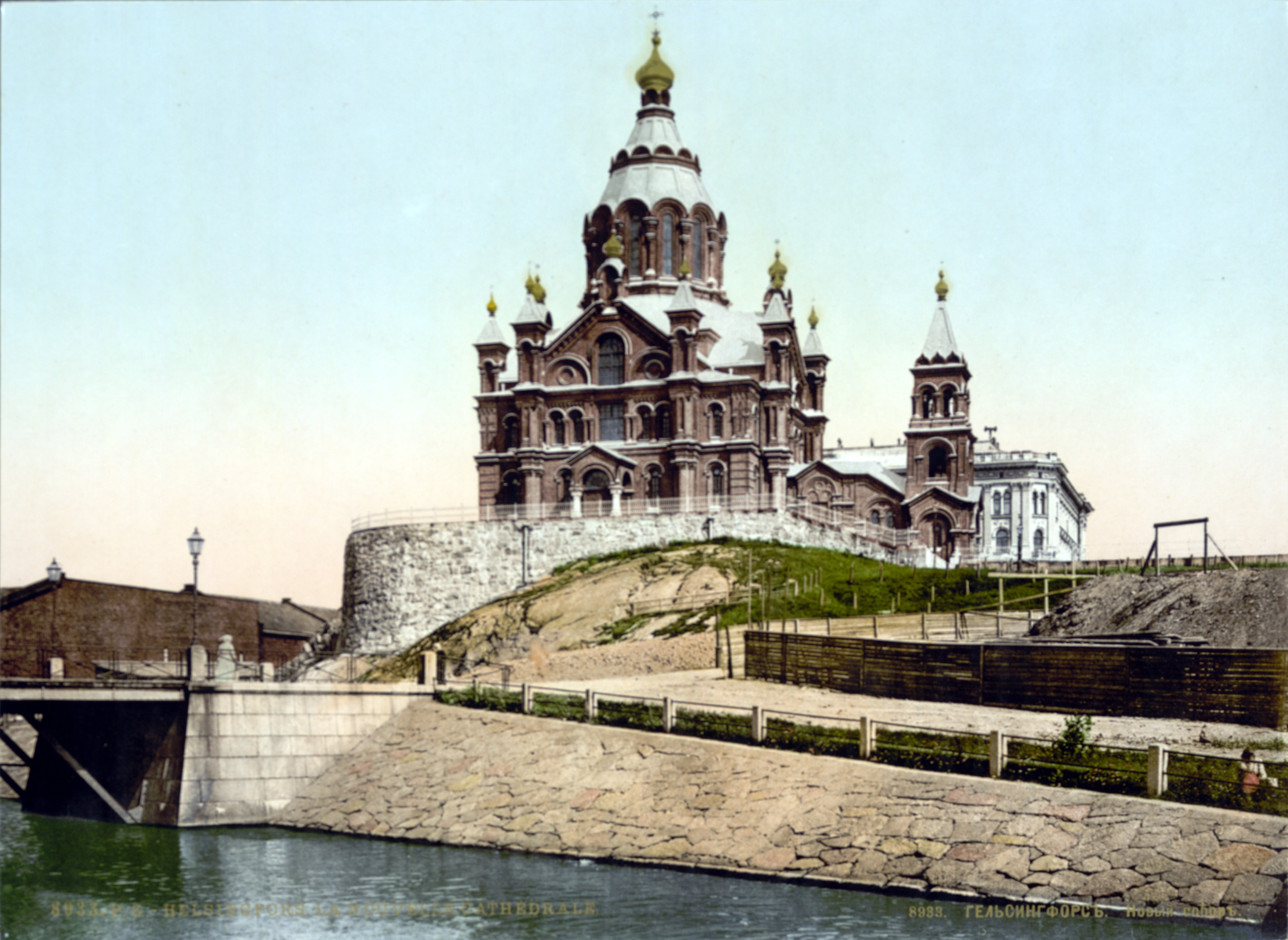
Aleksey Gornostayev, Uspenski Cathedral, Helsinki (1868).

This period also marked the establishment of the first architecture courses in Finland, and in 1879 these began at the Polytechnical Institute in Helsinki, though at first with German or German-educated teachers. Other Finns went abroad for various periods of time to study. In fact, Jacob Rijf (1753-1808) is noted as the first Finn to have studied architecture at the Royal Swedish Academy of Arts in Stockholm in 1783–84, though he is a rare early exception. He became a notable designer of churches throughout Finland, including Hyrynsalmi church (1786) and Oravais church (1797). One hundred years later it was also still quite rare; e.g. notable revivalist-style architect Karl August Wrede studied architecture in Dresden, and Theodor Höijer at the Royal Swedish Academy of Arts in Stockholm. Also, Gustaf Nyström studied both architecture and town planning in Vienna in 1878–79. His buildings are typical of the eclecticism of the time, designing in both Gothic Revival style and a so-called neo-Renaissance style of classicism, with heavy ornamentation as well as heavy use of colour in interiors but also occasionally in facades, as for instance with his House of the Estates, Helsinki (1891). The semi-circular Rotonda (1902–07), Gustaf Nyström's design for the extension to C.L. Engel's neoclassical Helsinki University Library (1845), demonstrates both an outwardly stylistic continuity with the original - albeit the pilasters have not classical capitals but reliefs, made by the sculptor Walter Runeberg, personifying the sciences - whilst also employing modern techniques in the Art Nouveau interior: the semicircular 6-storey extension comprises a large light-well surrounded by radially placed bookshelves. Due to the then stringent fire-safety requirements, the extension has a framework of steel and reinforced concrete, with reinforced concrete stairs, an iron construction supporting the large glazed roof and metal windows. After graduating at the Polytechnical Institute, Usko Nyström (no relation) had continued his studies at the École des Beaux-Arts in Paris in 1890–91; on returning to Finland he initially designed (from 1895 to 1908 in the partnership Usko Nyström-Petrelius-Penttilä) neo-Renaissance architecture - in particular gaining from the growth area of building speculation in middle-class apartment buildings in Helsinki - whilst also developing a more Jugendstil style inspired by National Romanticism, and politically by the pro-independence Fennoman movement. Usko Nyström's chief work, the Grand Hôtel Cascade, Imatra (1903) (nowadays called Imatran Valtionhotelli), is a key Jugendstil style building; the "wilderness hotel", built next to the impressive Imatra Rapids (the biggest in Finland), was intended mostly for wealthy tourists from the Russian Imperial capital of Saint Petersburg, while its architectural style was inspired by Finnish National Romanticism, whilst taking its inspiration partly from the medieval and neo-Renaissance French châteaux Usko Nyström had seen during his time in France.

Gustaf Nyström, House of the Estates, Helsinki (1891).

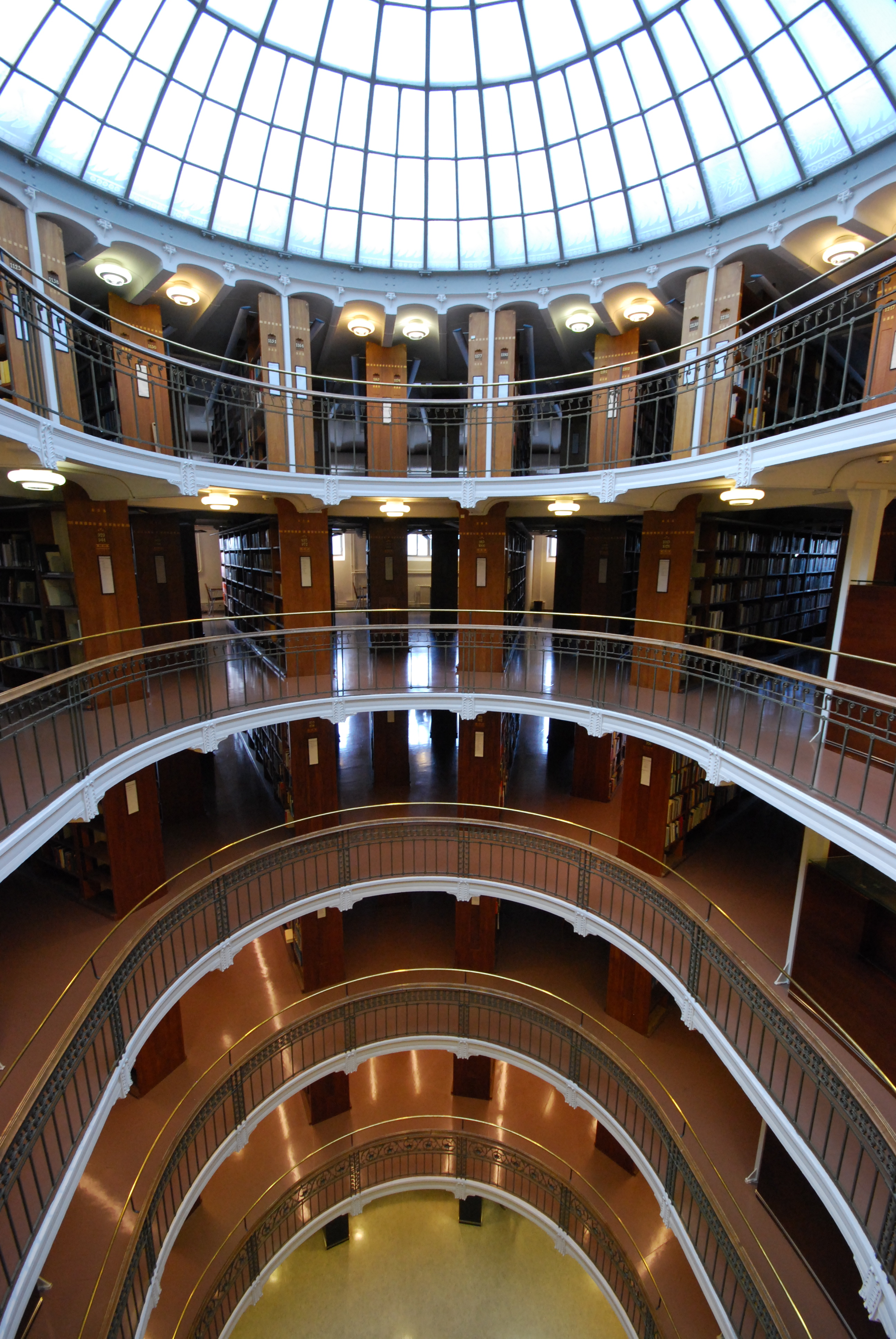
Gustaf Nyström, Rotonda, Helsinki University Library (1906).

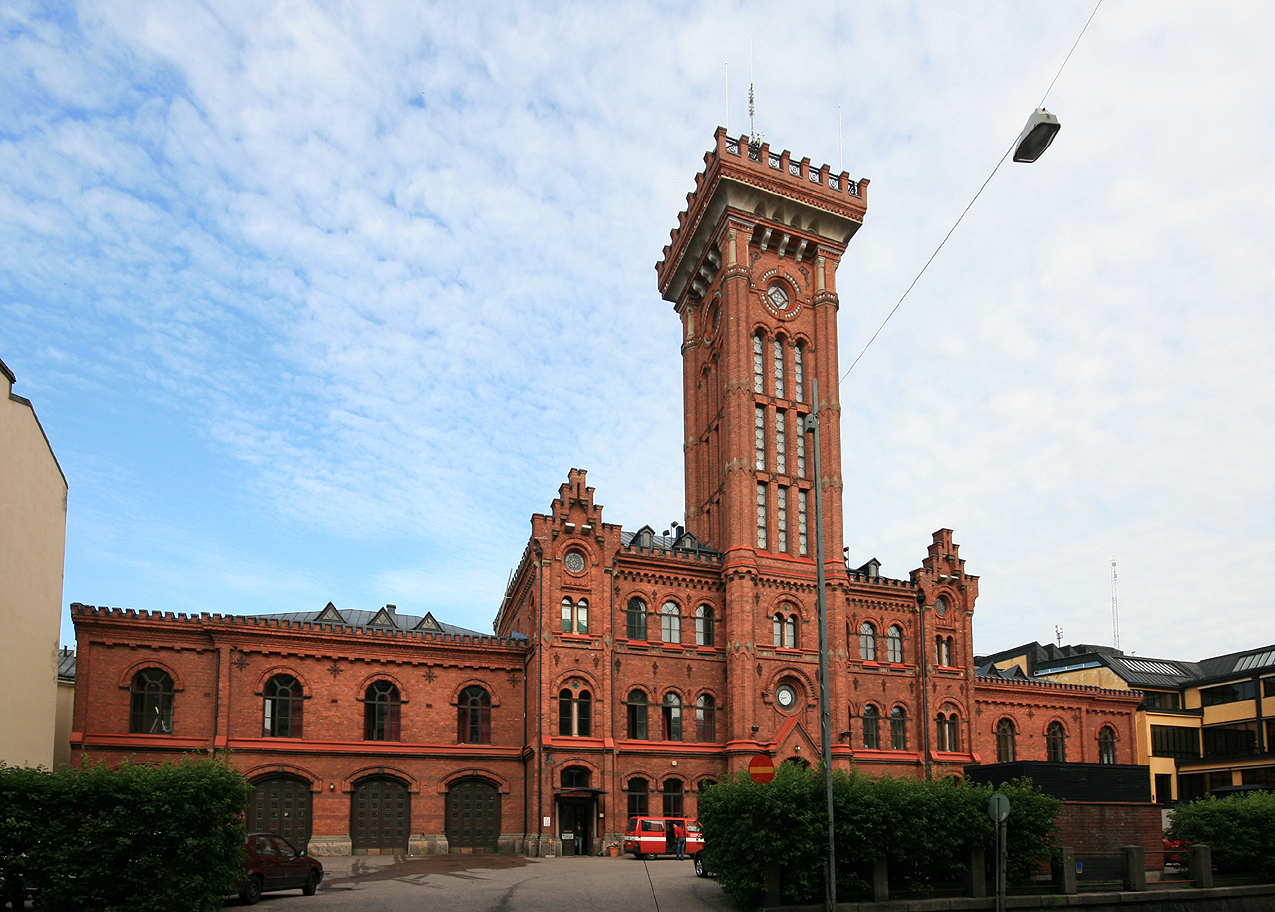
Theodor Höijer, Erottaja fire station, Helsinki (1891).

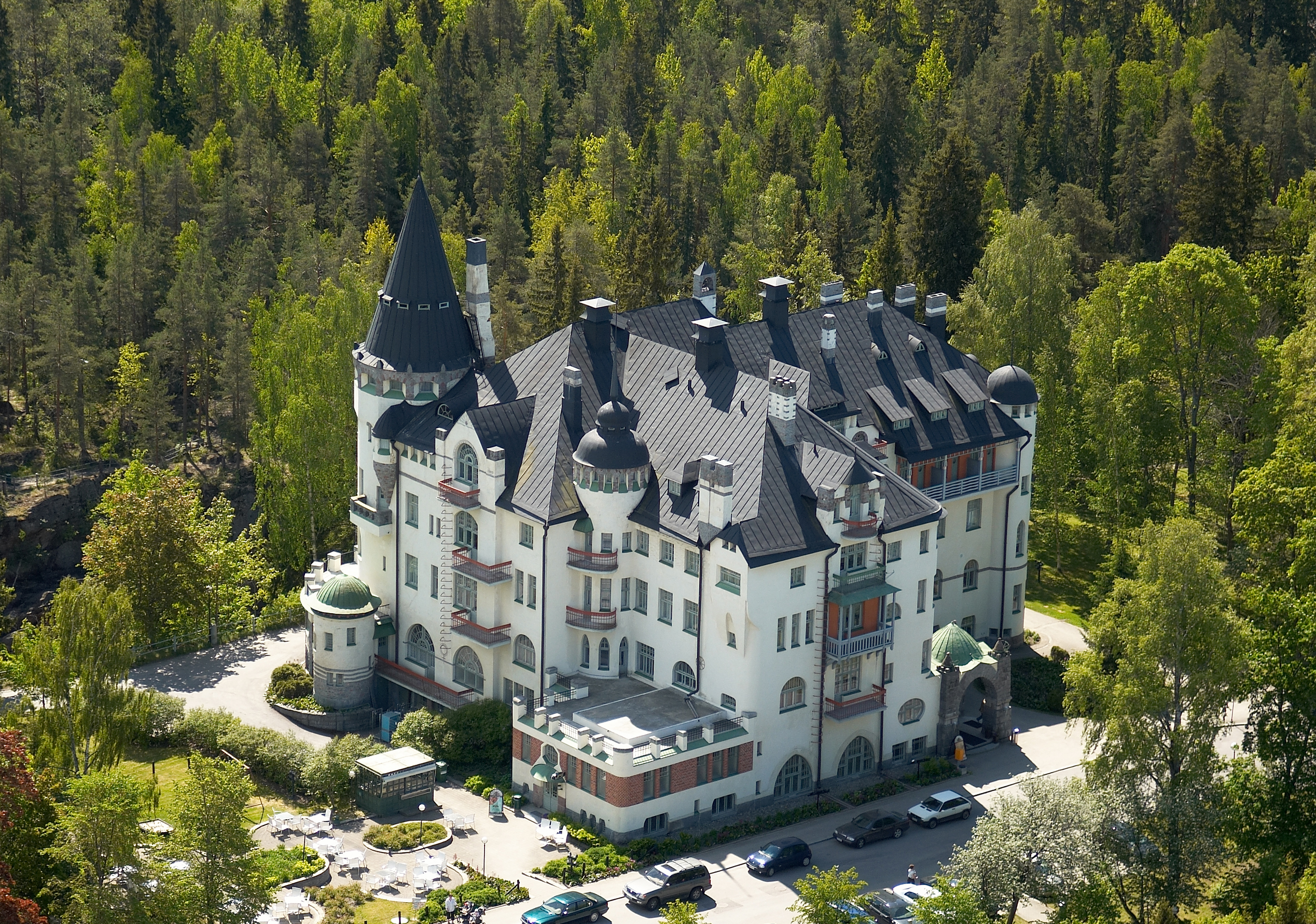
Grand Hôtel Cascade, Imatra (1903) (nowadays Imatran Valtionhotelli) Usko Nyström, 1903.

=== Late Grand Duchy period: Jugend ===
At the end of the 19th century Finland continued to enjoy greater independence under Russia as a grand duchy; however, this would change with the coming to power of Czar Nicholas II in 1894, who introduced a greater process of "Russification". The reaction to this among the bourgeois classes was evident, too, in the arts, for instance in the music of Jean Sibelius and the artist Akseli Gallén-Kallela - but also in architecture. The Finnish Architects Club was founded in 1892 within the Swedish-speaking Engineering Society (Tekniska Föreningen). Originally a loose forum for collaboration and discussion, its voluntary basis meant that it operated informally in cafés and restaurants. In this way it resembled many of the writers’ or artists’ clubs of the time and generally fostered a collegial spirit of some solidarity. It quickly helped to establish the architect as an artist responsible for aesthetic decisions. In 1903, as a supplement to the engineering publication, the Club published the first issue of Arkitekten (‘The Architect’ in Swedish, the predominant language still in use at the time among professional classes and certainly architects).

In 1889 the artist Albert Edelfelt depicted the national awakening in a poster showing Mme Paris receiving Finland, a damsel, who alights with a model of St Nicholas' Church (later Helsinki Cathedral) on her hat; the parcels in the boat are all marked EU (i.e. Exposition Universelle). A distinct symbolic importance was given in 1900 to Finland receiving its own pavilion at the Paris World Expo, designed by young architects Herman Gesellius, Armas Lindgren and Eliel Saarinen in the so-called Jugendstil style (or Art Nouveau) then popular in Central Europe. The Finnish pavilion was well received by the European press and critics, albeit usually tying the building closely with Finland's cultural-political circumstances. For example, the German art historian and critic Julius Meier-Graefe wrote of the pavilion: "From the peripheries... we would like to mention the extremely effective Finnish pavilion, with its extremely simple and modern design ... the character of the country and the people and the strong conditioning of its artists for the decorative are reflected in the building in the most pleasant way.".

The Jugendstil style in Finland is characterised by flowing lines and the incorporation of nationalistic-mythological symbols - especially those taken from the national epic, Kalevala - mostly taken from nature and even medieval architecture, but also contemporary sources elsewhere in Europe and even the USA (e.g. H.H. Richardson and the Shingle Style). The more prominent buildings of this National Romantic style were built in stone, but the discovery in Finland of deposits of soapstone, an easily carved metamorphic rock, overcame the difficulty of using only hard granite; an example of this is the facade of the Pohjola Insurance Building, Helsinki (1901) by Gesellius, Lindgren, and Saarinen. The Jugendstil style became associated in Finland with the fight for national independence. The importance of nationalism also was made evident in the actual surveying of Finnish vernacular buildings: all architecture students at that time - at Finland's then only school of architecture, in Helsinki - became acquainted with the Finnish building heritage by measuring and drawing it. From the 1910s onwards, in addition to large medieval castles and churches also 17th and 18th century wooden churches and neoclassical wooden towns were surveyed - a practice which continues in the Finnish schools of architecture even today. The Jugendstil style was used by Gesellius, Lindgren, and Saarinen in key state buildings such as the National Museum and Helsinki Railway Station. Other architects employing the same style were Lars Sonck and Wivi Lönn, one of the first female architects in Finland.

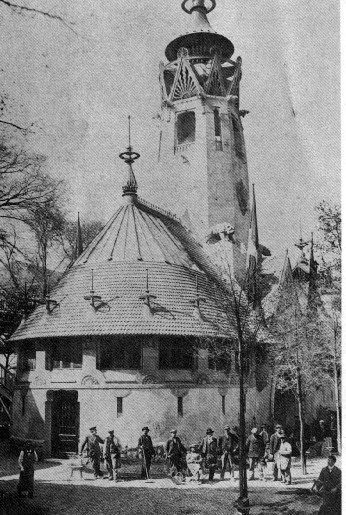
Finnish Pavilion at Paris Expo 1900.

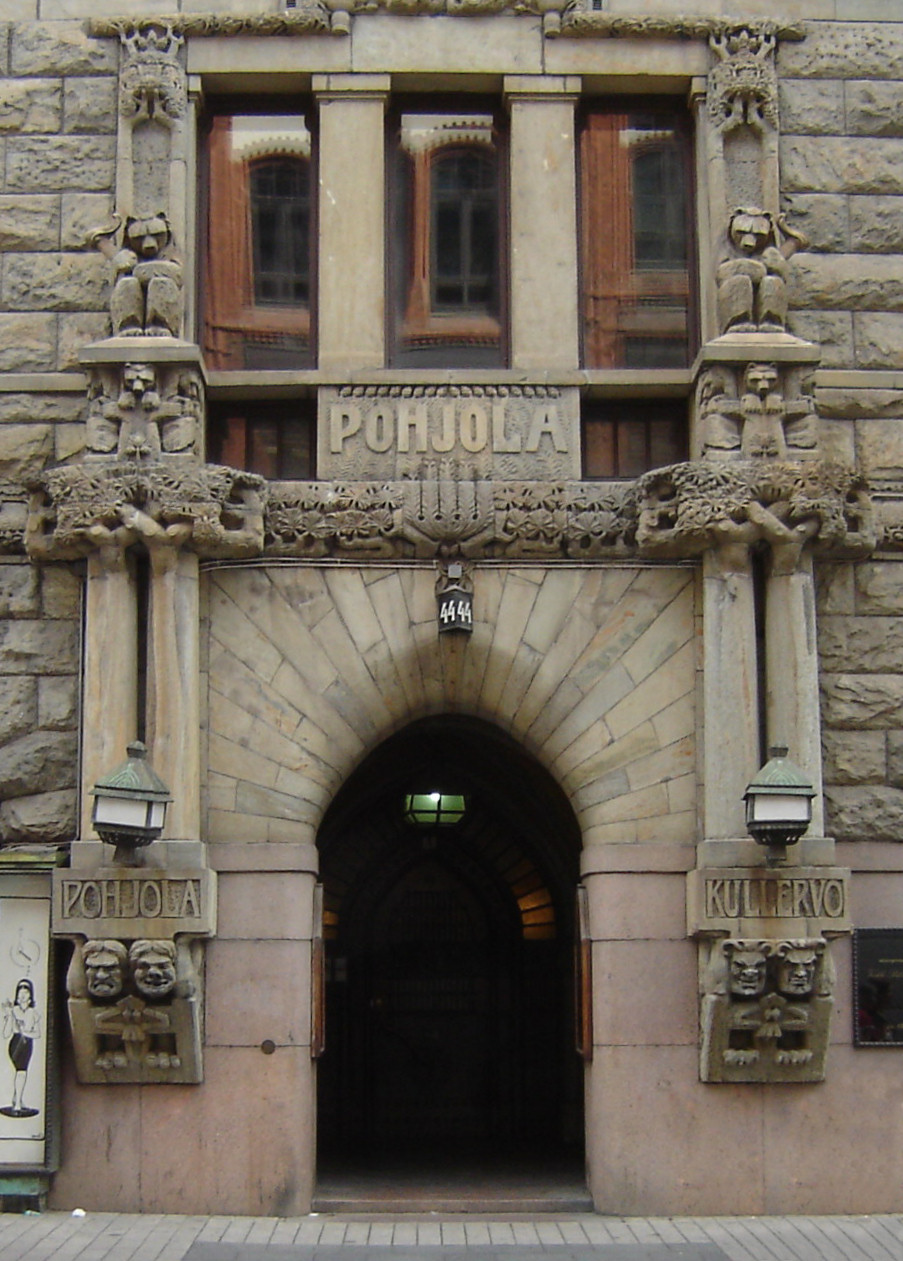
Pohjola Insurance Building, Helsinki, Gesellius, Lindgren, and Saarinen, 1901.

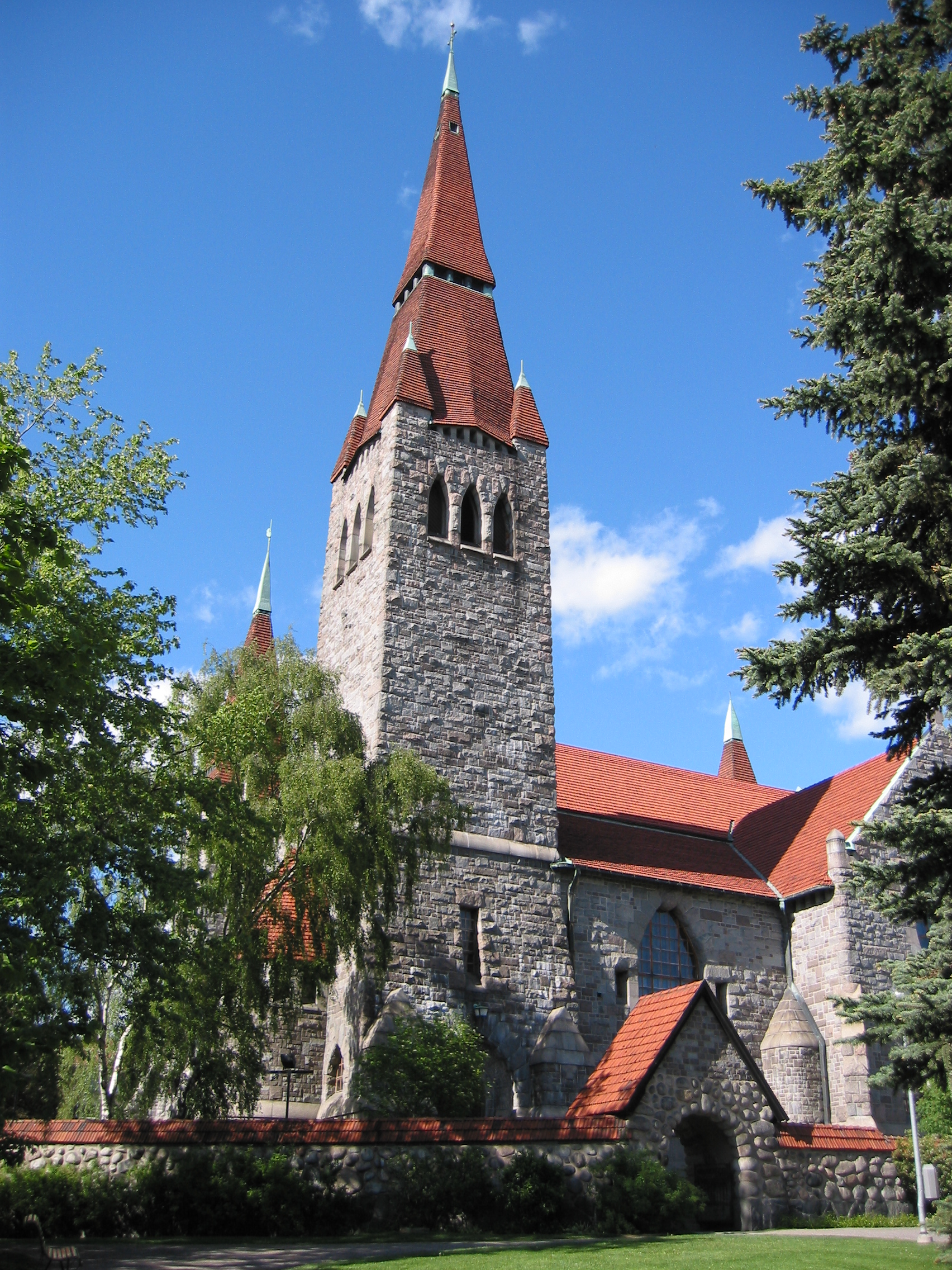
Tampere Cathedral, Lars Sonck, 1902-1907.

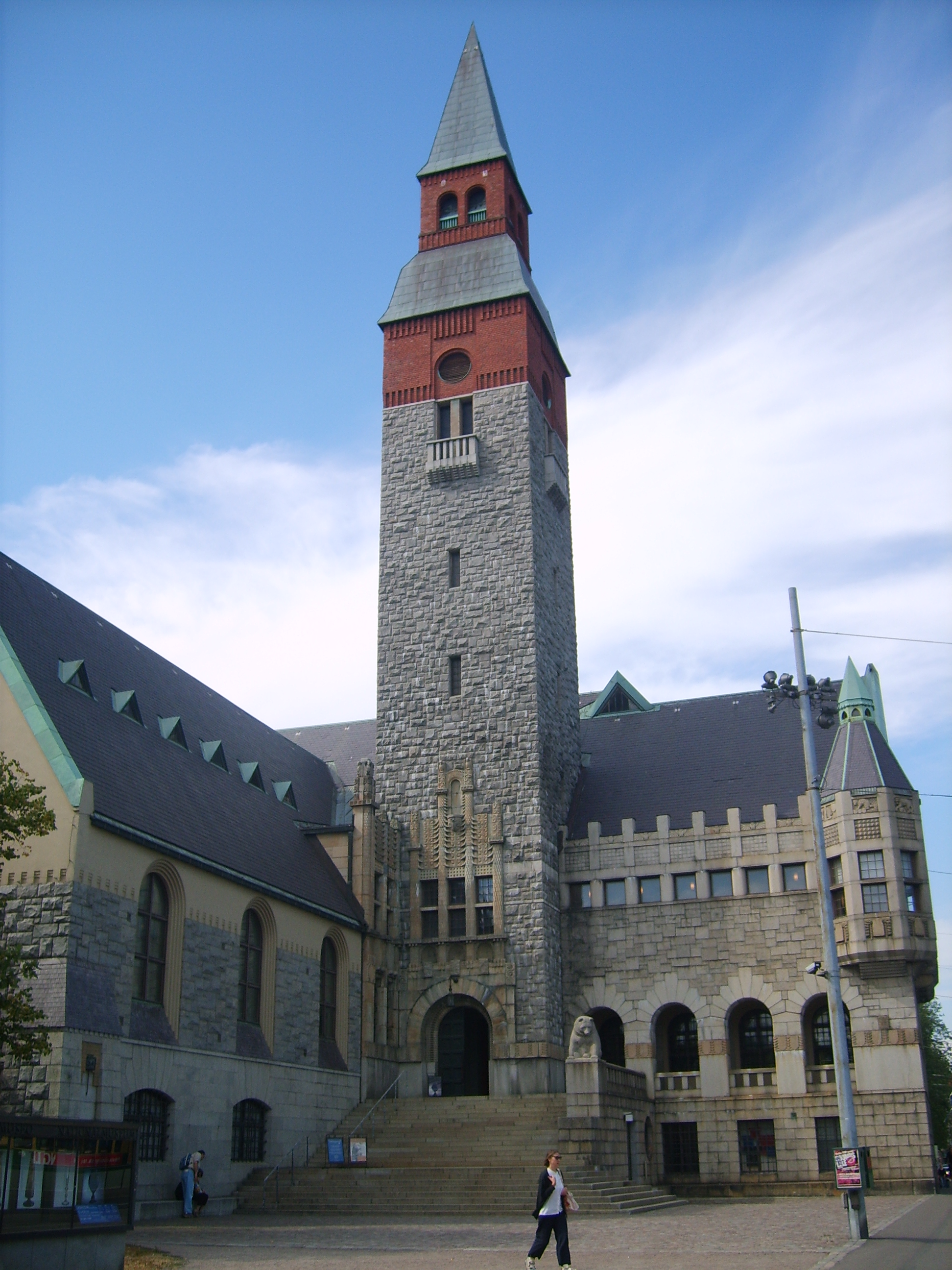
National Museum of Finland, Helsinki, Gesellius, Lindgren, and Saarinen, 1916.

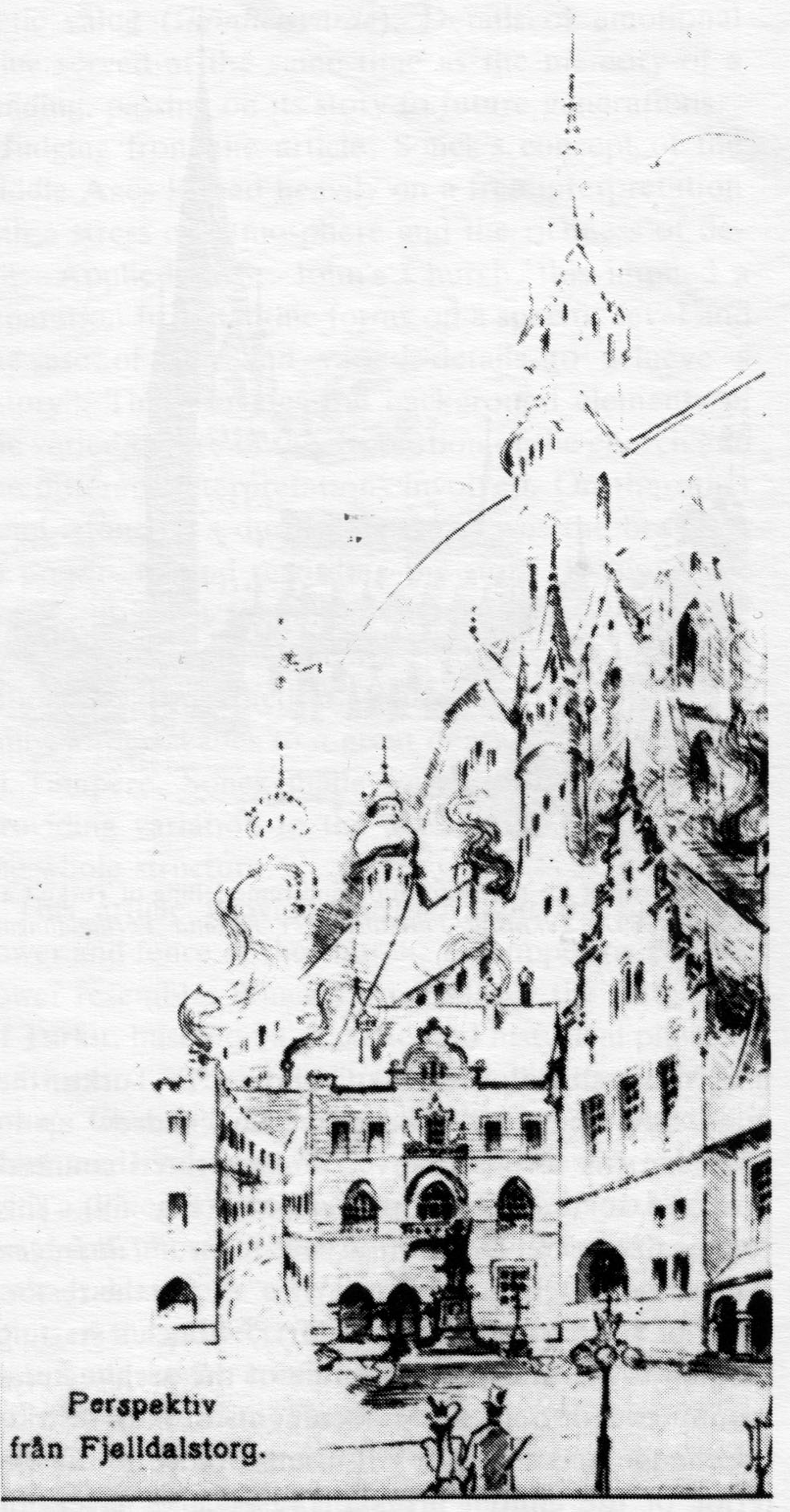
Töölö competition drawing, Helsinki, Lars Sonck, 1899.

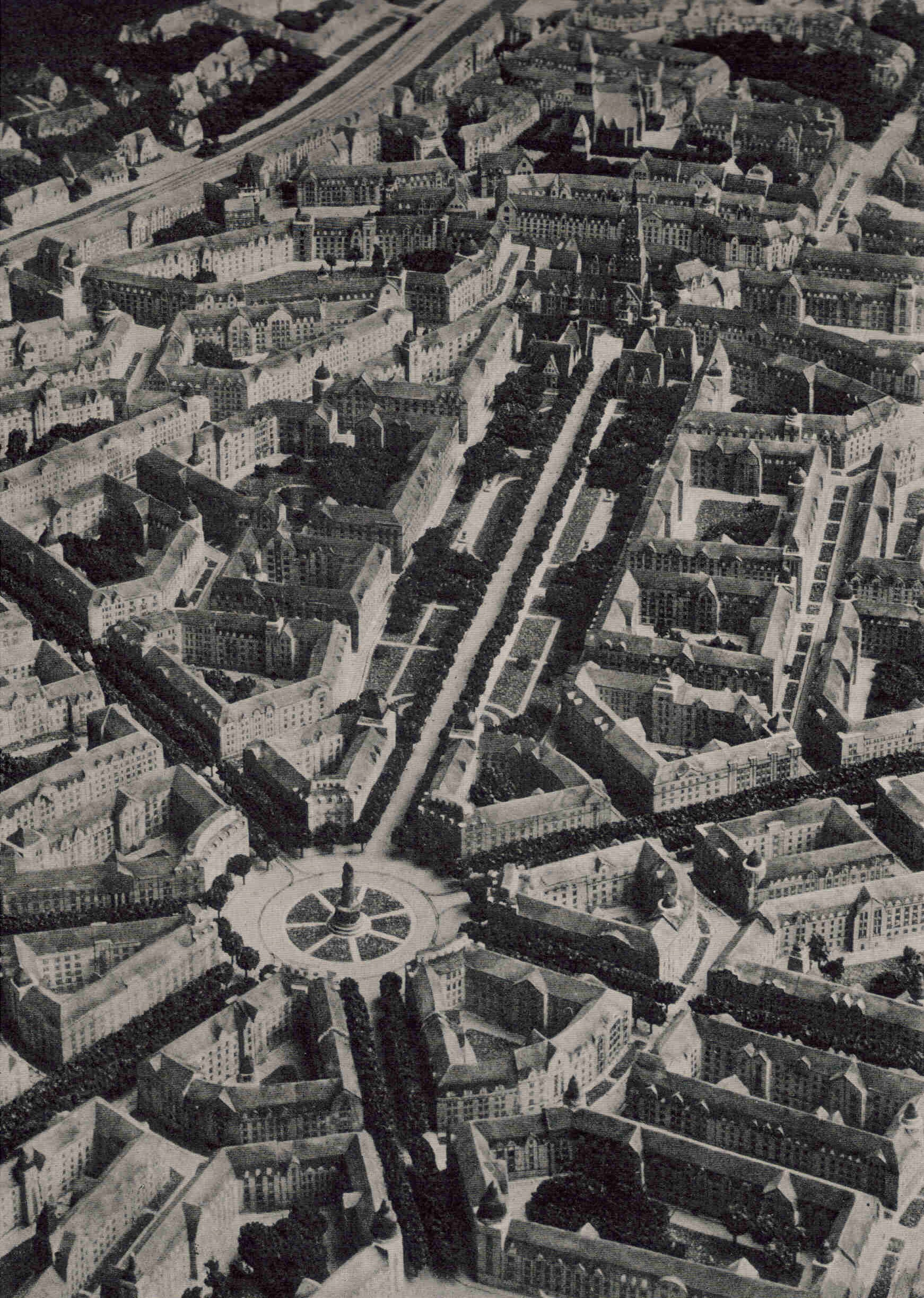
Detail of the model of the Munkkiniemi-Haaga town plan, Helsinki, Eliel Saarinen, 1915.

Even at the height of the Jugendstil style, there were opponents who criticised the stagnant tastes and mythological approaches whereby Jugendstil was becoming institutionalised. The most well-known opponents were architect-critics Sigurd Frosterus and Gustaf Strengel. Frosterus had worked briefly in the office of Belgian-born architect Henry van de Velde in Weimar in 1903, and at the same time Strengel worked in London at the office of architect Charles Harrison Townsend. Their critique was partly inspired by the results for the 1904 competition to design the Helsinki railway station, won by Eliel Saarinen. In the jury report, the architecture of Frosterus's entry was described as "imported". That same year Frosterus entered the competition for the Vyborg railway station, which Saarinen again won. Frosterus was a strict rationalist who wanted to develop architecture towards scientific ideals, instead of the historical approach of Jugendstil. In Frosterus's own words: "We want an iron and brain style for the railway stations and exhibition buildings; we want an iron and brain style for stores, theatres and concert halls." According to him, an architect had to analyse his tasks of construction in order to be able to logically justify his solutions, and he must take advantage of the possibilities of the latest technology. The particular challenge of his time was reinforced concrete. Frosterus considered that the buildings of a modern metropolis should be "constructivist" in expressing their purpose and technology honestly. He designed a number of private residences, but made his major breakthrough in 1916, gaining second prize in the competition for the Stockmann department store in the heart of Helsinki. He was eventually commissioned to realise the building, which was completed after Finland gained independence, in 1930. It would be misleading to see the Jugendstil style as wholly opposed to classicism; Frosterus's own works combined elements of both. Another key example is the Kalevakangas Cemetery Chapel in Tampere, designed by Wäinö Palmqvist and Einar Sjöström; they had won an architectural competition for the project in 1911, and it was completed in 1913. While containing many of the decorative elements familiar from Jugendstil, the overall form borrows from a key classical model, the Pantheon in Rome.

Another point of debate at that time was that of the merits of urbanism. Again, of importance here were opposing views from abroad, namely the picturesque theories of town planning proposed by Viennese city planner Camillo Sitte, as put forward in his influential book City Planning According to Artistic Principles (1889) and the opposing classical-rational urbanism point of view also proposed in Vienna by Otto Wagner, heavily influenced by the Parisian model - under the directorship of Baron Haussmann from 1858 to 1870 - of driving wide boulevards through the old labyrinthine city with the intent of modernising traffic and waste management, as well as enabling the greater social control of the population. This debate came to a head in Finland in the first ever town planning design competition in 1898-1900 for the Töölö district of Helsinki. Three entries were lifted out for recognition; first prize to Gustaf Nyström (together with engineer Herman Norrmén), second prize to Lars Sonck, and third prize to a joint entry by Sonck, Bertil Jung and Valter Thomé. Nyström's scheme represented classicism with wide main streets and imposing public buildings arranged in symmetrical axial compositions, and the other two in the Sittesque style, with the street network adapted to the rocky terrain and with picturesque compositions. A fantastic sketch accompanying Sonck's competition entry gives an indication of the imagery he was aiming for, inspired by his travels in Germany. Historian Pekka Korvenmaa makes the point that the leading theme was the creation of the atmosphere of medieval urban environments - and Sonck later designed a similar proposal in 1904 to rearrange the immediate surroundings of St.Michael's Church in Helsinki, with numerous "fantastic" spired buildings. In the Töölö competition, undecided what course of action to take, however, the City Council asked the prize-winners to submit new proposals. When this led to further stalemate Nyström and Sonck were commissioned to work together on the final plan combining Nyström's spacious street network and elements of Sonck's Sittesque details. The final plan (1916) under the direction of Jung, made the scheme more uniform, while the architecture is seen as typical of the Nordic Classicism style. A typical street in the plan is that of Museokatu, with tall lines of buildings in a classical style along a curving street line. A still wider (24 metres) new tree-lined boulevard was that of Helsinginkatu, driven through the working-class district of Kallio, first outlined in 1887 by Sonck, but with further input from Nyström, and completed in around 1923.

But even more ambitious than the town plan for Töölö were Eliel Saarinen's two other plans for Helsinki: the Munkkiniemi-Haaga plan of 1910-15 and the Pro-Helsingfors plan of 1918, both originating from private land speculation rather than public planning. The former was for a city development of 170 000, which equalled the entire population of central Helsinki at that time. The scheme was equally inspired by the Parisian axiality of Haussman, the intimate residential squares of Raymond Unwin in the English garden cities and the large-scale apartment blocks of Otto Wagner in Vienna. However, in the publication presenting the Munkkiniemi-Haaga plan, Saarinen and his co-authors were somewhat critical of the Sittean influence, arguing that "Particularly in the case of the metropolis, Sittean Romanticism has shown itself to be completely incapable of providing appropriate designs." Only small fragments of the scheme were ever completed. The Pro-Helsingfors plan involved the expansion of central Helsinki - which even included filling in the Töölö Bay in the centre of the city, replacing it with a wide boulevard - as well as the planning of smaller satellite communities - what Saarinen termed 'organic decentralization', again inspired by the British garden city principle - around the edge of the city. No aspects of the latter scheme were ever realised.

A major architectural-historical event was the emigration of Eliel Saarinen to the United States in 1923, after he received second prize in the Chicago Tribune Tower competition of 1922. On moving to the United States, Saarinen designed the campus for the Cranbrook Academy of Art (1928) in his same architectural style, while architects in Finland moved on much more quickly into modernism.

Vyborg railway station competition entry, Sigurd Frosterus, 1904.

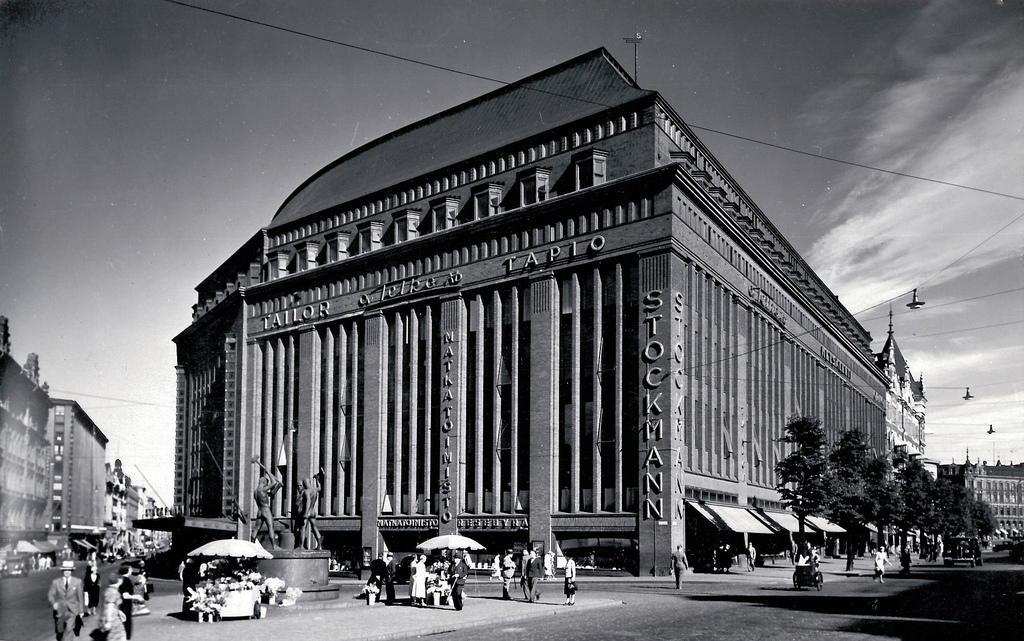
Stockmann department store, Helsinki, Sigurd Frosterus, 1916-30.

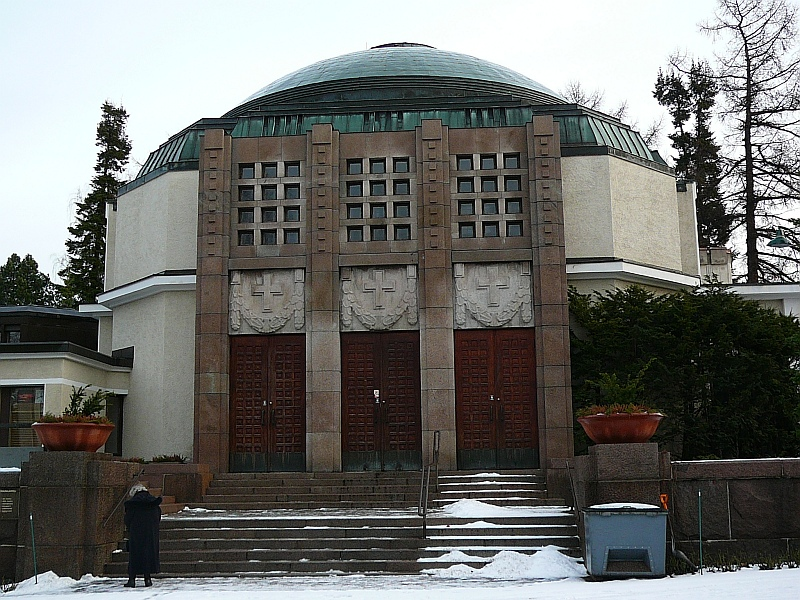
Kalevakangas Cemetery Chapel, Tampere, Wäinö Palmqvist and Einar Sjöström, 1913.

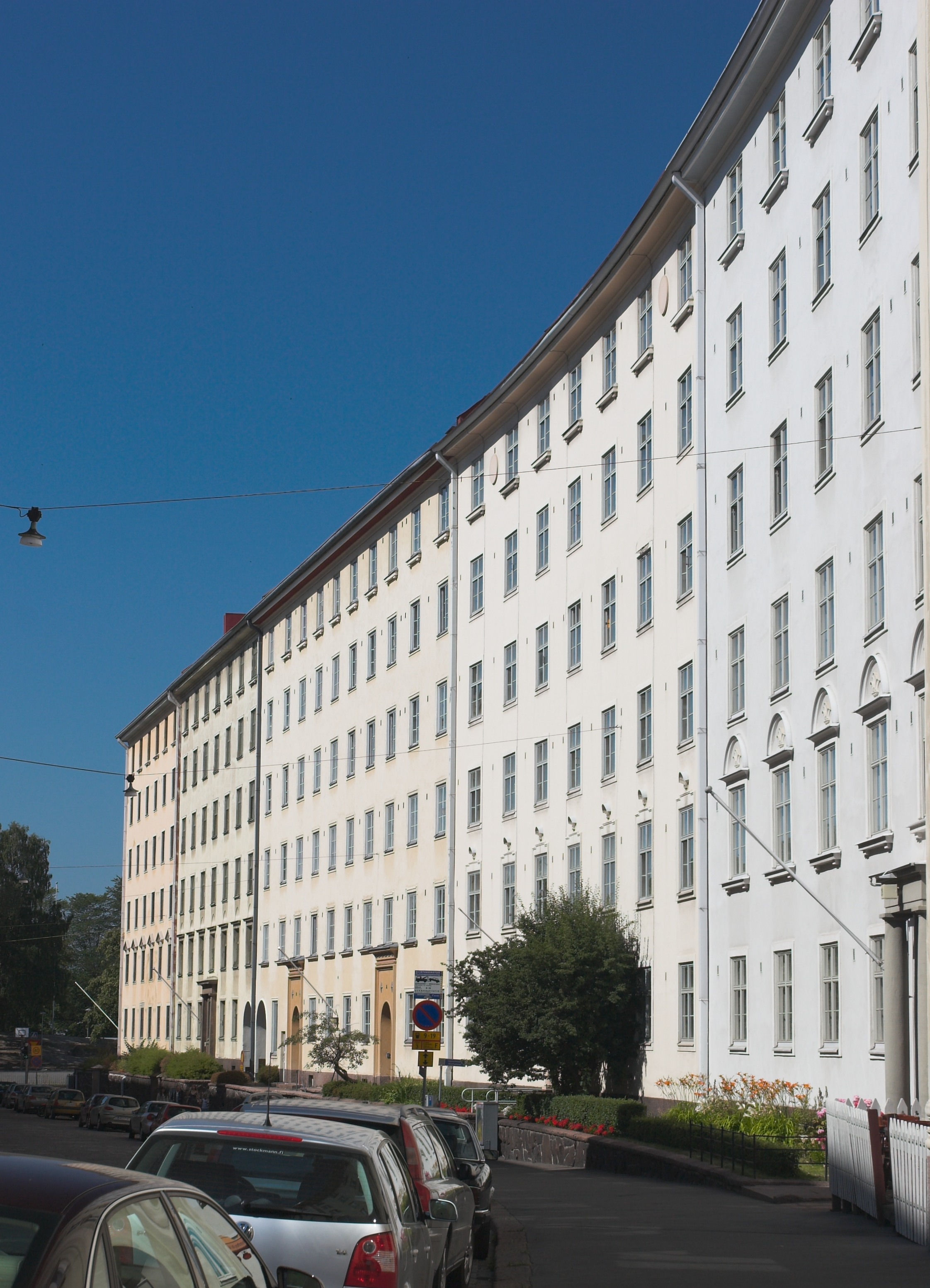
Lars Sonck, 1920s-30s urbanism, Museokatu, Töölö, Helsinki.

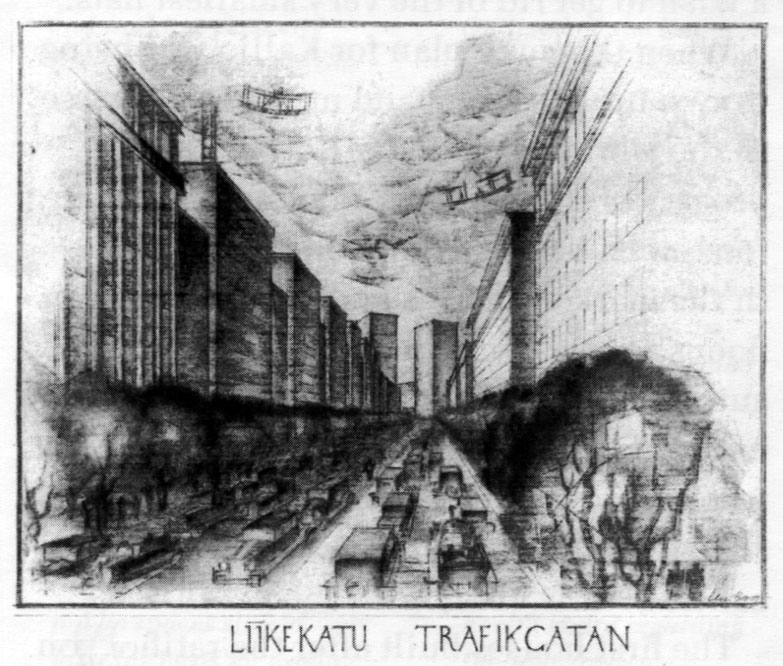
Oiva Kallio, Helsinki town plan, 1920s.

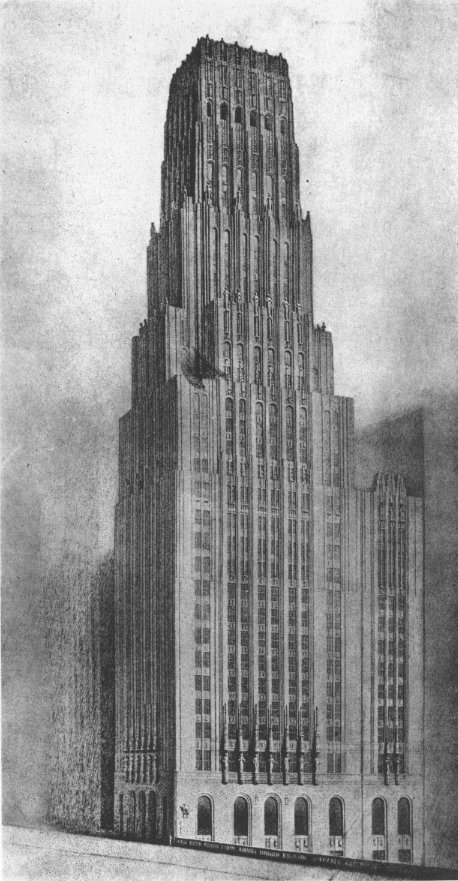
Eliel Saarinen's unbuilt Chicago Tribune Tower, 1922.

== Post-independence, 1917– ==
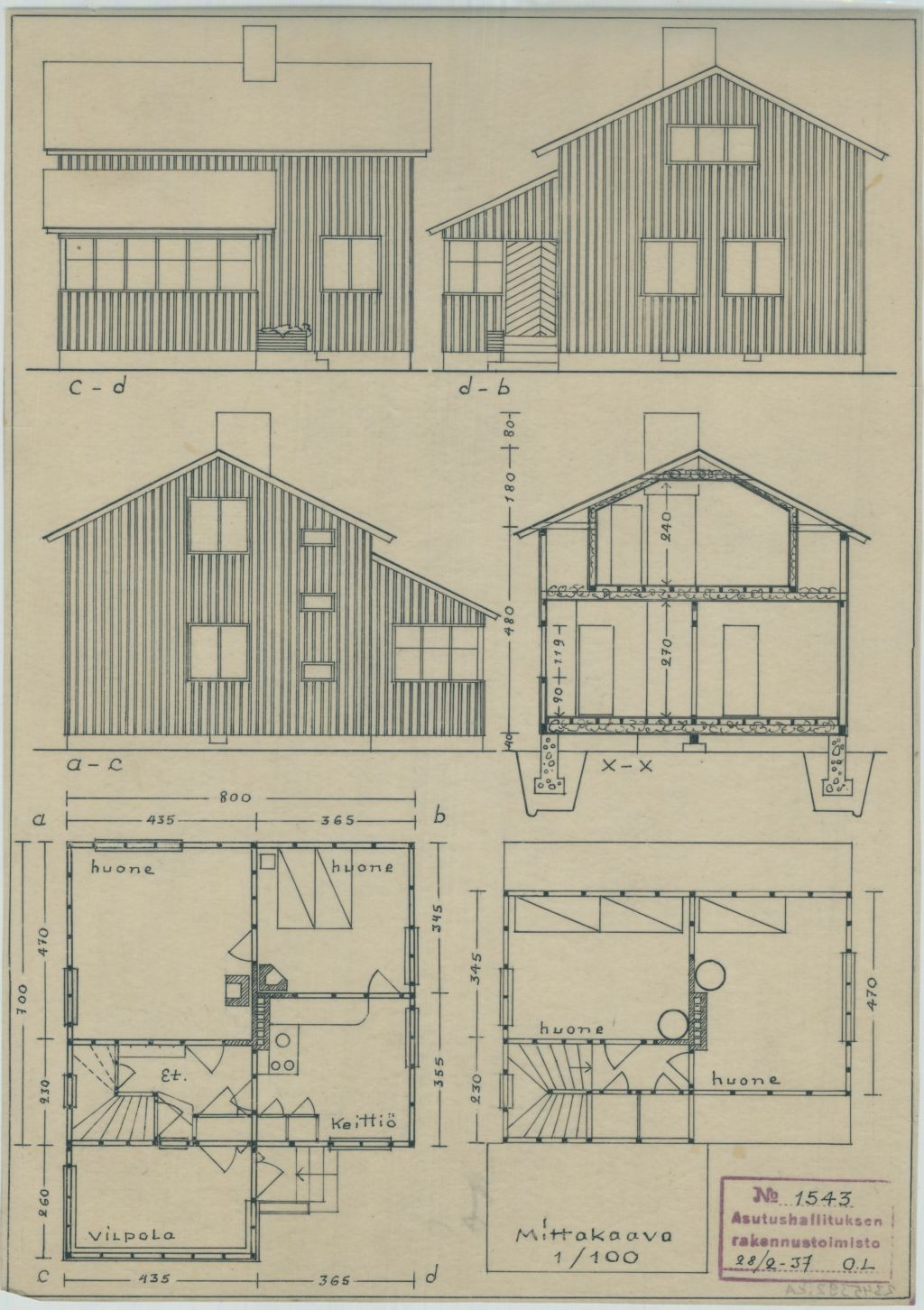
National Board of Settlements (Asutushallitus) type-house, 1937.

=== Nordic classicism and international Functionalism ===
With Finland's independence achieved in 1917, there was a turn away from the Jugendstil style, which became associated with bourgeois culture, as well as the heavier Neo-Renaissance style. In turn there was a brief return to a lighter classicism, so-called Nordic Classicism, influenced to an extent by architect study trips to Italy, but also by key examples from Sweden, in particular the architecture of Gunnar Asplund. Notable Finnish architects from this period include J. S. Sirén and Gunnar Taucher, as well as the later work of Jugendstil architects such as Armas Lindgren and the early work of Alvar Aalto, Erik Bryggman, Martti Välikangas, Hilding Ekelund and Pauli E. Blomstedt. The most notable large scale building from this period was the Finnish Parliament building (1931) by Sirén. Other key buildings built in this style were the Finnish Language Adult Education Centre in Helsinki (1927) by Taucher (with key assistance from P.E. Blomstedt), Vyborg Art Museum and Drawing School (1930) by Uno Ullberg, "Taidehalli" Art Gallery, Helsinki (1928) and Töölö Church, Helsinki (1930) by Hilding Ekelund, and several buildings by Alvar Aalto, in particular the Workers' Club, Jyväskylä (1925), the South-West Finland Agricultural building, Turku (1928), Muuramäki Church (1929) and the early version of the Vyborg Library (1927–1935) before Aalto greatly modified his design in line with the emerging Functionalist style.

But beyond these public buildings designed in the Nordic Classicism style, this same style was also used in urban development - filling in the street grids, and replacing wooden houses with multi-storey developments, but also extending to workers' housing, most notably the Kone & Silta company's workers' housing (1929) in Helsinki by architects Armas Lindgren and Bertel Liljequist, particularly notable for its grand inner courtyard. But the style was also applied to timber-constructed workers' housing, most famously in the Puu-Käpylä ("Wooden Käpylä") district of Helsinki (1920–1925) by Martti Välikangas. The around 165 houses of Puu-Käpylä, modelled on farmhouses, were built from traditional square log construction clad in vertical boarding, but the construction technique was rationalised with an on-site "factory" with a partly building element technique. The principle of standardization for housing generally would take off during this time. In 1922 the National Board of Social Welfare (Sosiaalihallitus) commissioned architect Elias Paalanen to design different options of farmhouses, which were then published as a brochure, Pienasuntojen tyyppipiirustuksia (Standard drawings for small houses) republished several times. In 1934 Paalanen was commissioned to design an equivalent urban type-house, and he came up with twelve different options. Alvar Aalto, too, became involved, from 1936, in standard small houses, designing for the Ahlström timber and wood product company, with three types of the so-called AA system: 40 m^{2} (Type A), 50 m^{2} (Type B) and 60 m^{2} (Type C). Though based on traditional farmhouses, there are also clear stylistic elements from Nordic Classicism but also modernism. However, it was with the repercussions of the Second World War that the standard system for house design took on even greater potency, with the advent of the so-called Rintamamiestalo house (literally: War-front soldier's house). These were built throughout the country; a particularly well-preserved example is the district of Karjasilta in Oulu. But this same house type also took on a different role in the aftermath of World War II as part of the Finnish war reparations to the Soviet Union; among the "goods" delivered from Finland to the Soviet Union were over 500 wooden houses based on the standard Rintamamiestalo house, deliveries taking place between 1944 and 1948. A number of these houses ended up being exported from the Soviet Union to various places in Poland, where small "Finnish villages" were established; for example, the district of Szombierki in Bytom, as well as in Katowice and Sosnowiec.

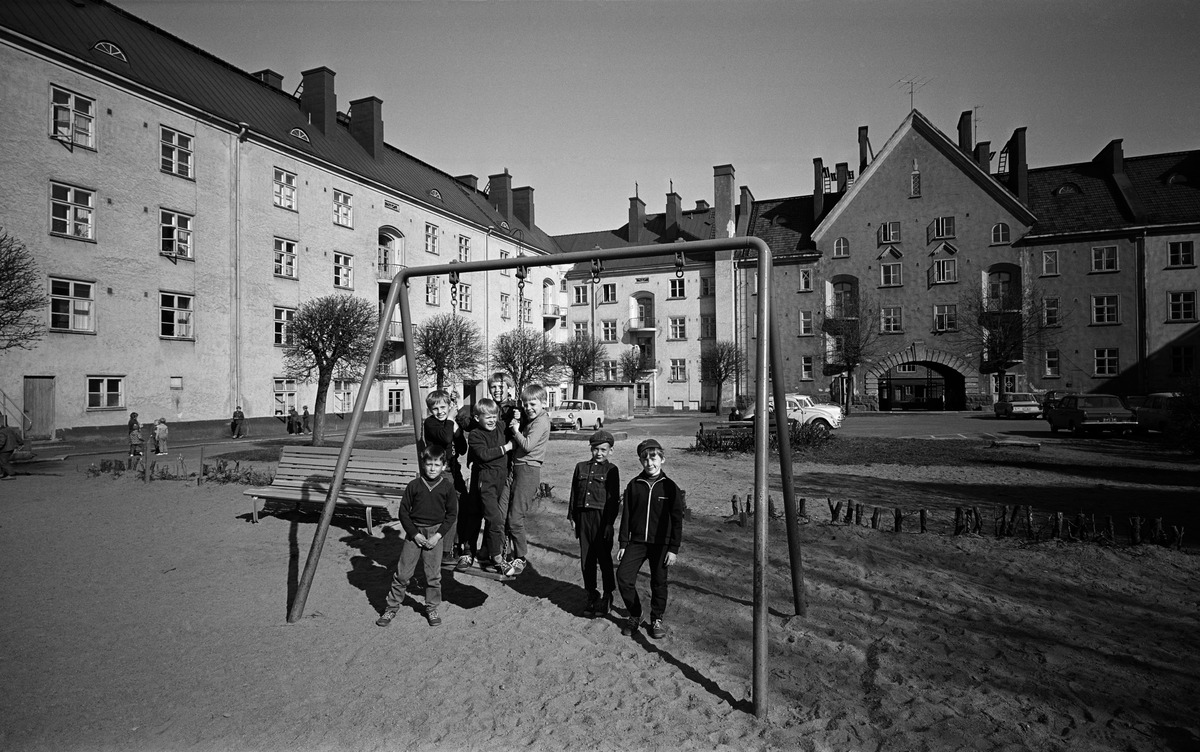
Workers’ Housing for Kone & Silta, Helsinki, Armas Lindgren and Bertel Liljequist, 1929.

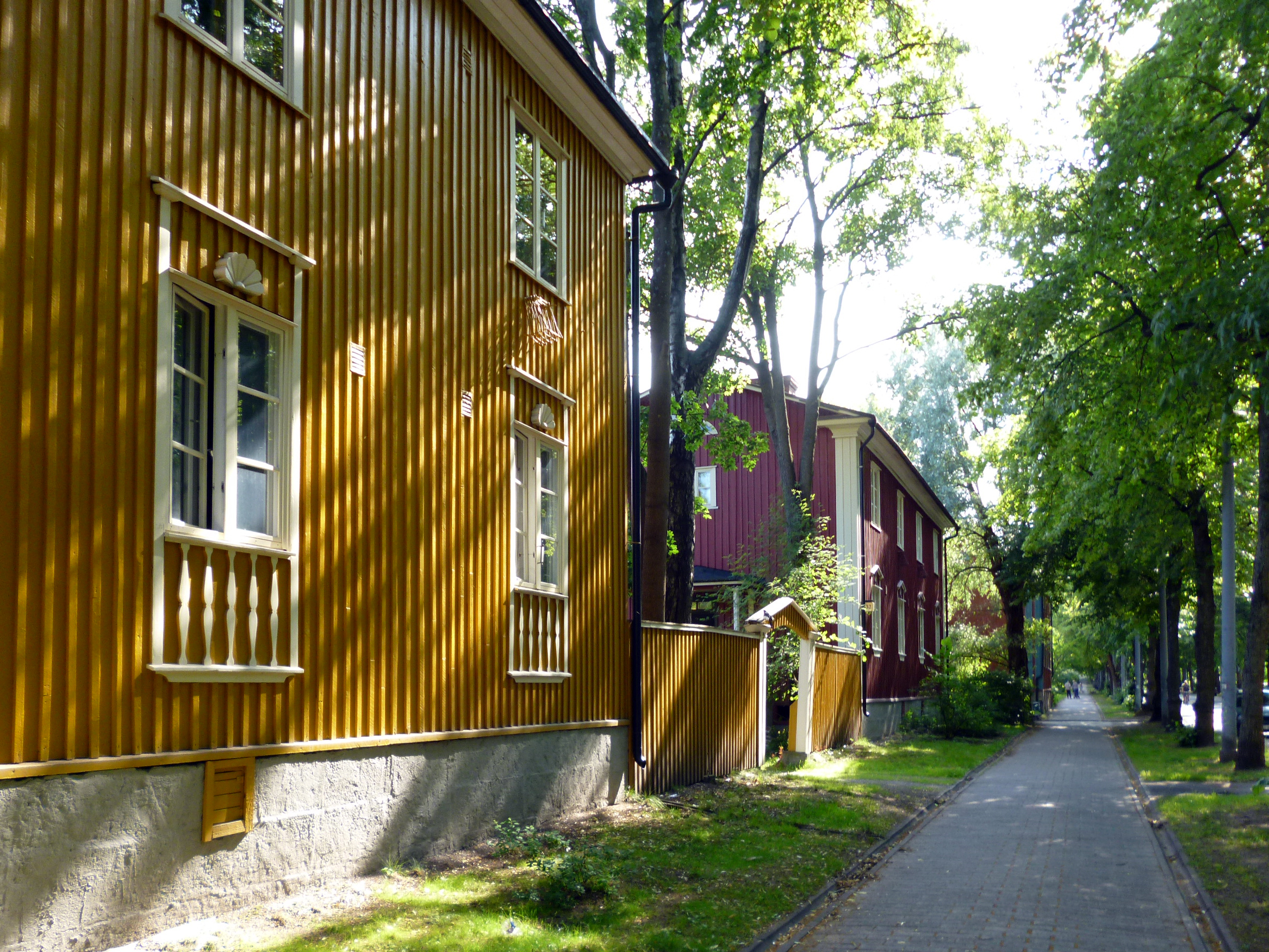
Puu-Käpylä workers' housing area Helsinki, Martti Välikangas, 1920–1925.

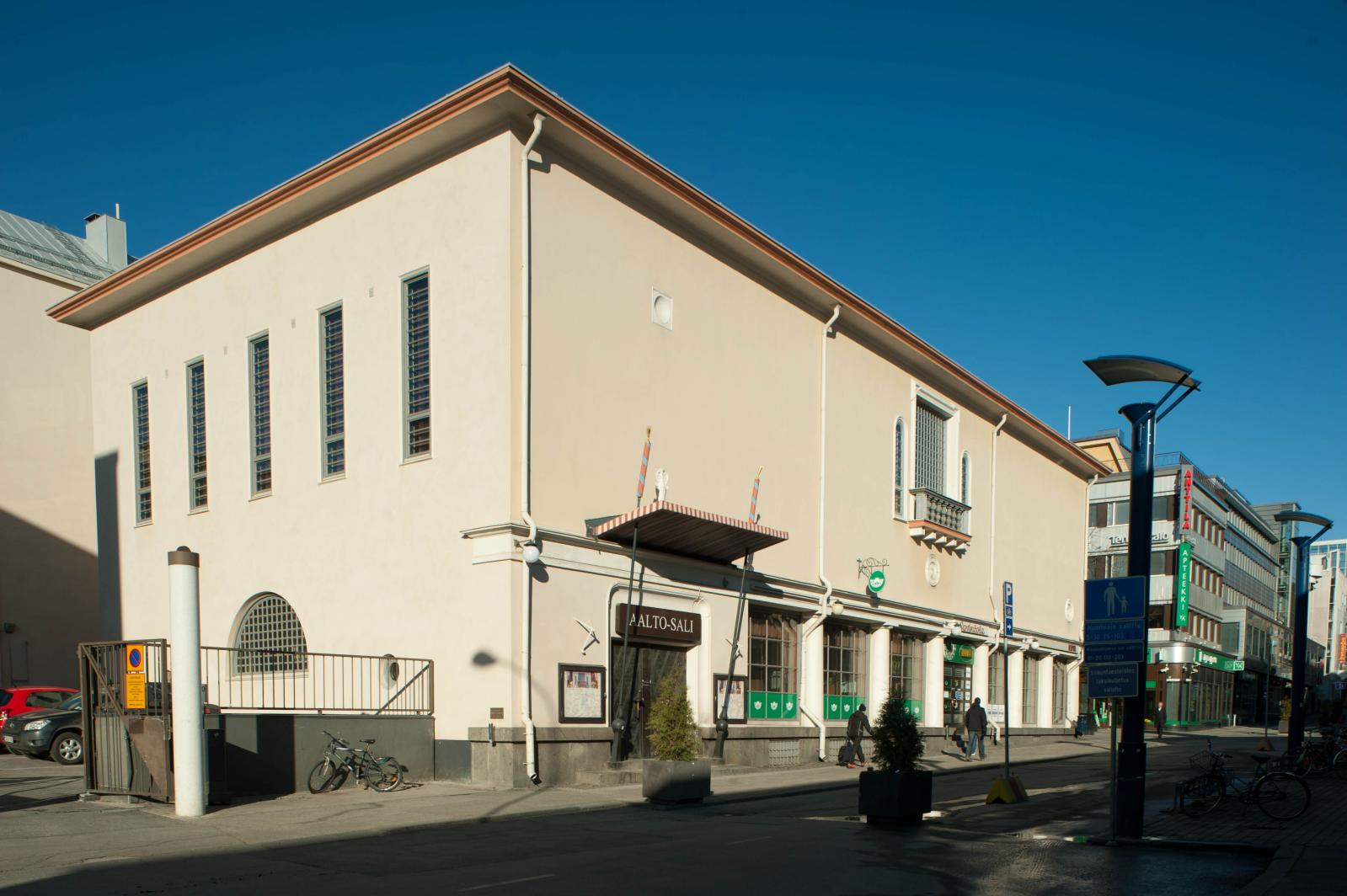
Workers' Club, Jyväskylä, Alvar and Aino Aalto, 1925.

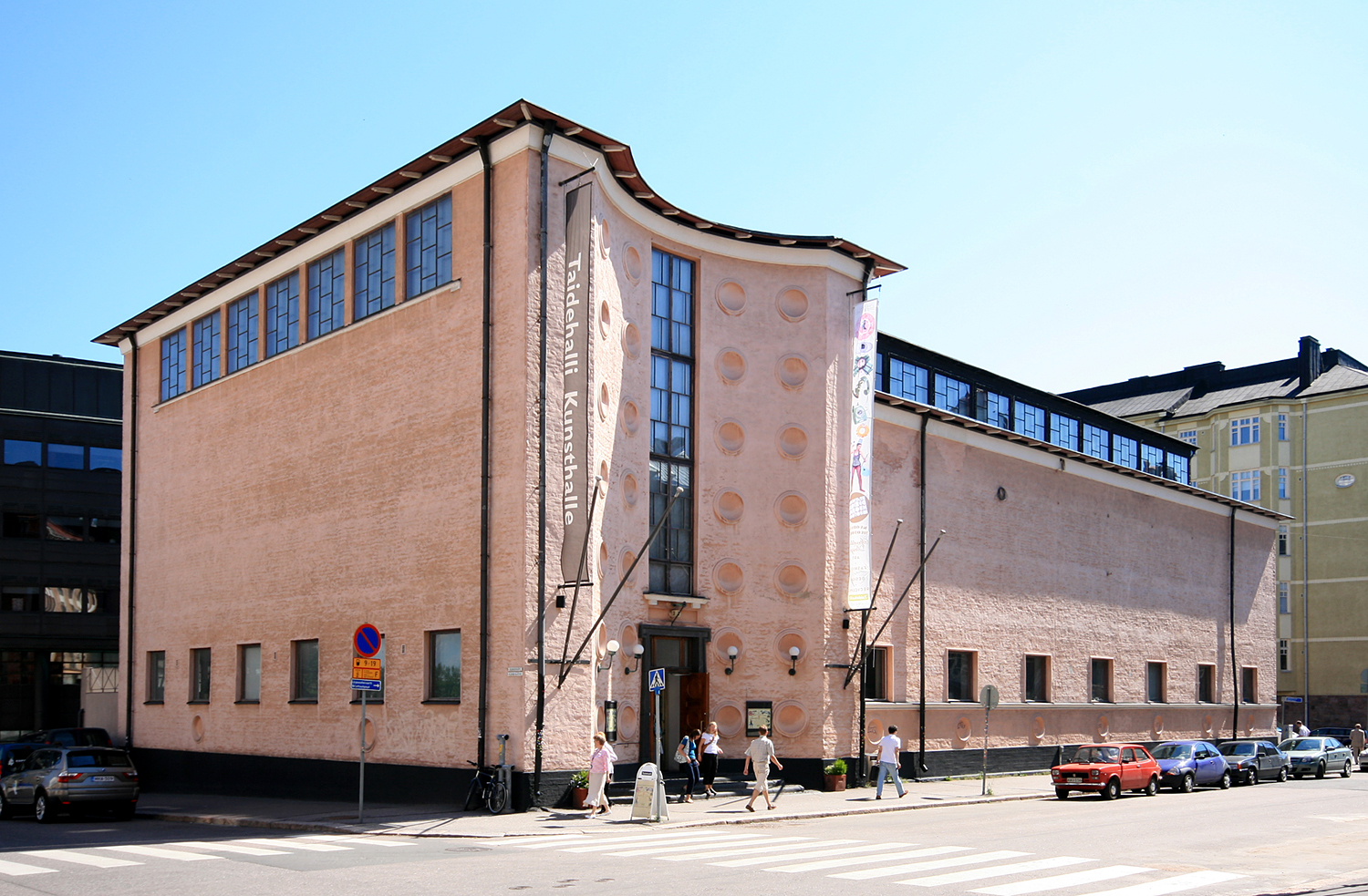
Taidehalli Art Gallery, Hilding Ekelund and Jarl Eklund, 1928.

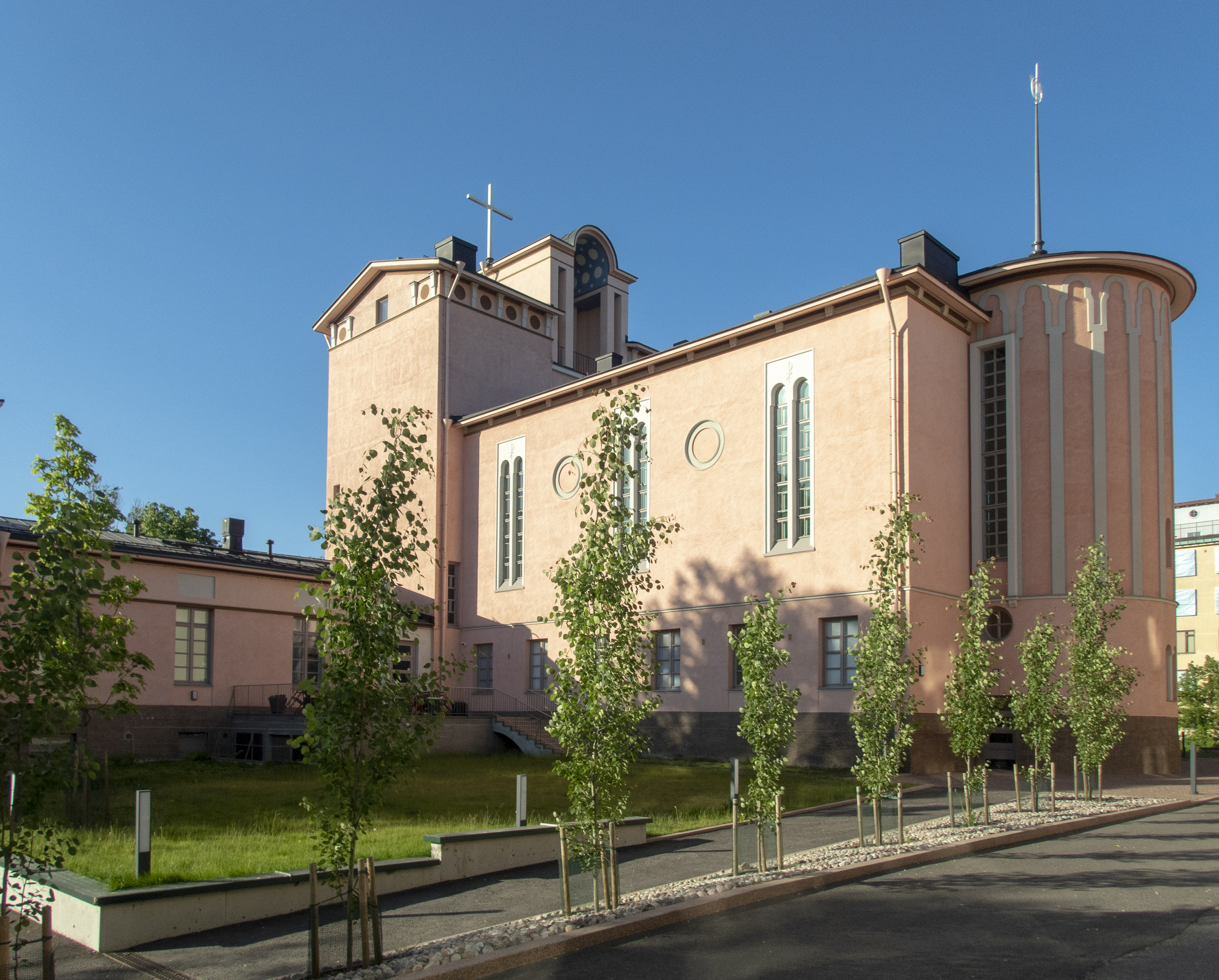
Töölö Church, Helsinki, Hilding Ekelund, 1930.

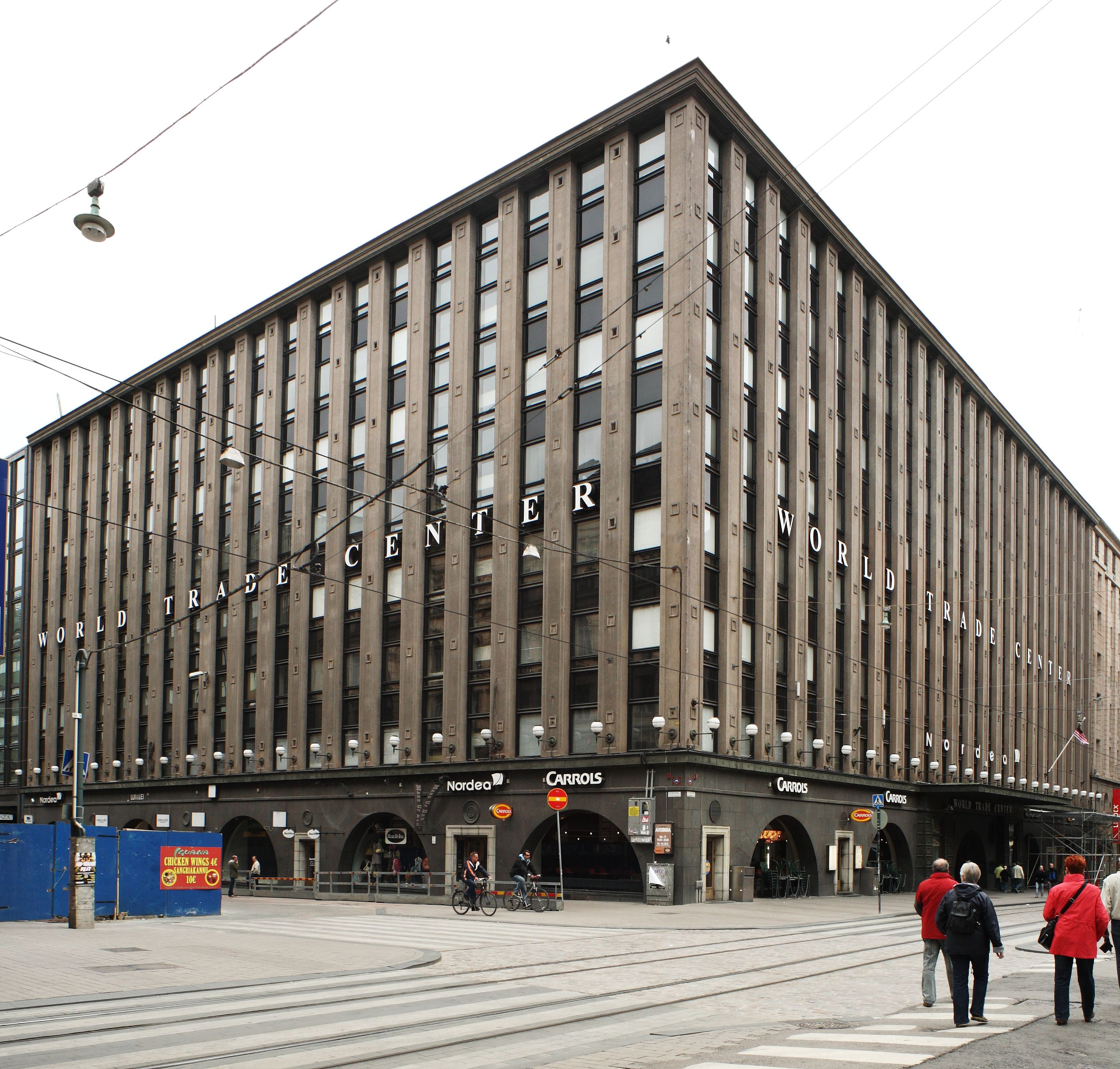
Liittopankki bank building, Helsinki, Pauli E. Blomstedt, 1929.

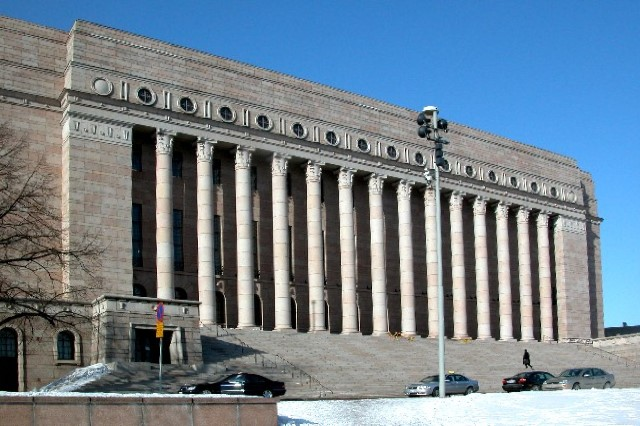
Finnish Parliament building, J.S. Sirén, 1931.

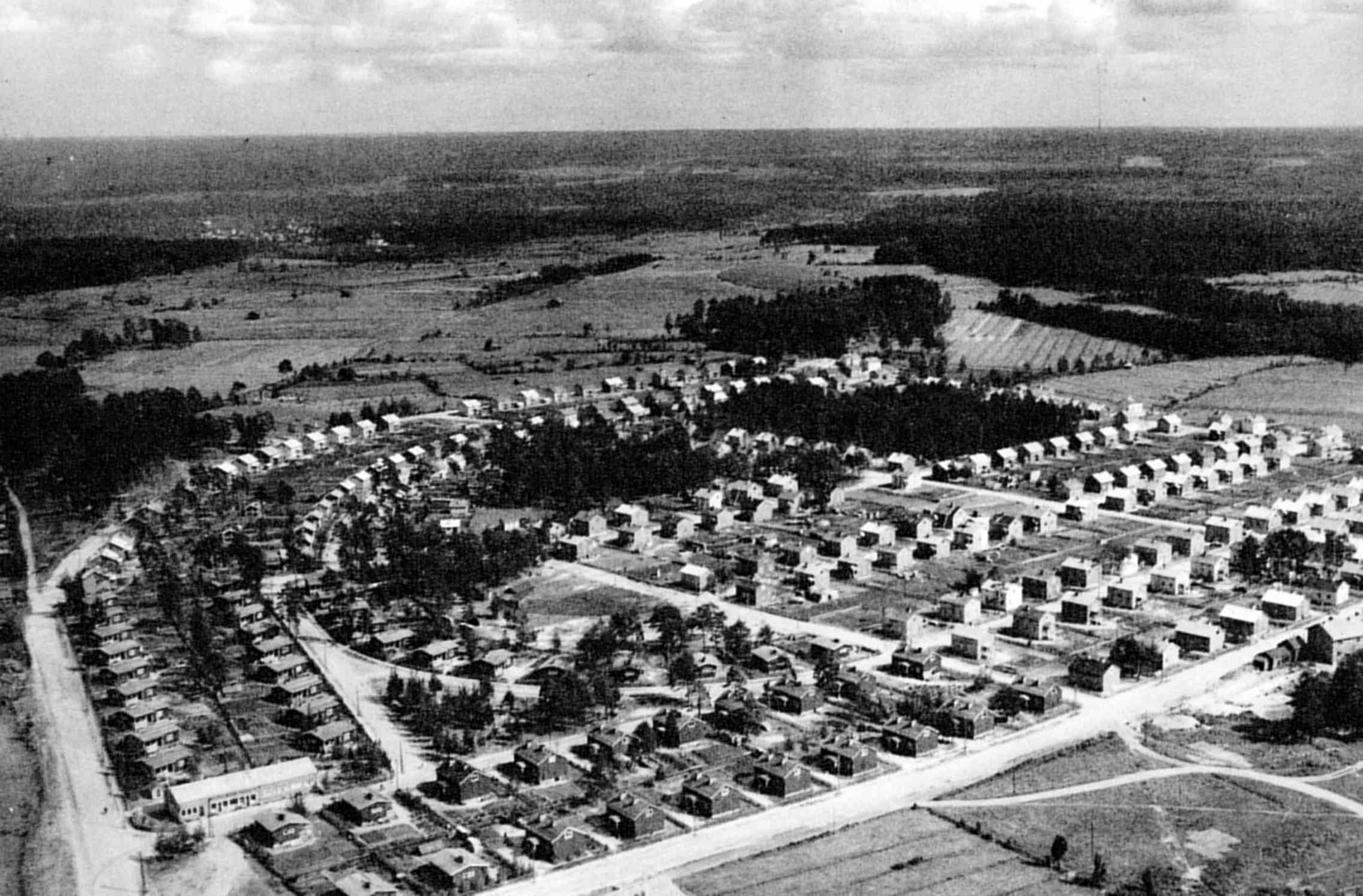
Rintamamiestalo (war veteran) houses, Karjasilta, Oulu, in 1950.

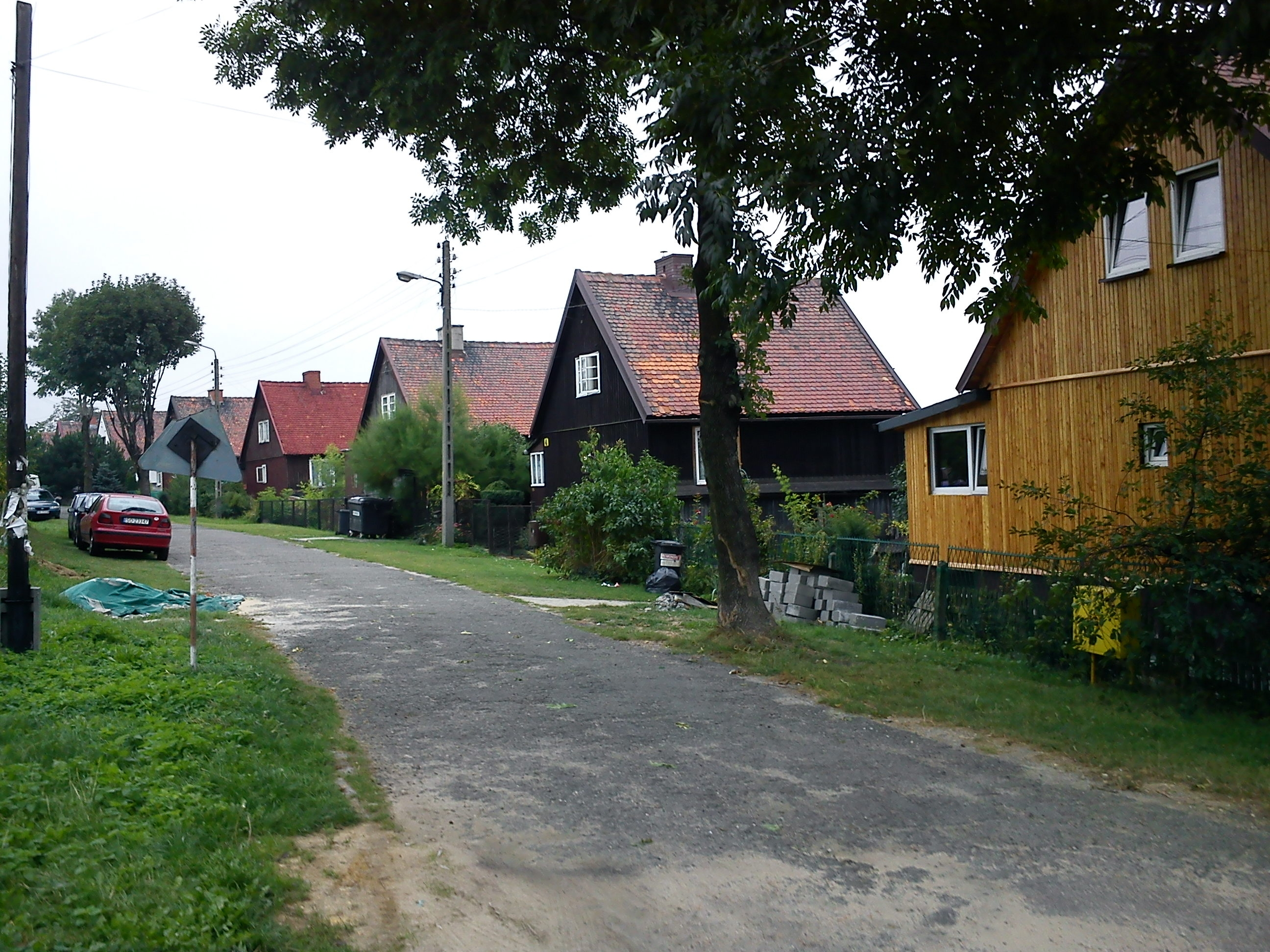
"Finnish houses" in Sosnowiec, Poland, late 1940s.

Apart from housing design, the period of Nordic Classicism is regarded as being fairly brief, surpassed by the more "continental" style – especially in banks and other office buildings – typified by Frosterus and Pauli E. Blomstedt (e.g. Liittopankki bank building, Helsinki, 1929). In reality, however, a synthesis of elements from various styles emerged. Nevertheless, but by the late 1920s and early 1930s there was already a significant move towards Functionalism, inspired most significantly by French-Swiss architect Le Corbusier, but also from examples closer to hand, again Sweden, such as the Stockholm Exhibition (1930) by Asplund and Sigurd Lewerentz. However, at the time, there were certainly architects who attempted to articulate their dissatisfaction with static styles, just as Sigurd Frosterus and Gustaf Strengel had criticised the National Romanticism. Pauli E. Blomstedt, who had certainly designed significant buildings in the Nordic Classicism style, then became a vehement critic, writing sarcastically in a 1928 essay "Architectural Anemia" about Nordic Classicism's sense of "good taste", at a time when he had already endorsed the white Functionalism:

There will soon be no difference between an architect and a fashionable tailor. Dress designers travel each spring to Parisian fashion houses, and we architects will make a trip to Stockholm or Gothenburg every now and then and find there the latest novelties of the season, that is, if they have not already been published in our 'Revue des Modes', Byggmästaren journal or Architekten journal. Window frames, ready-made colonnades and bitter-sweet colours, even complete interiors can find their way to Finland. But we have developed during the last few years, and the facades and the ciytscapes are made so harmonious! That's what many say. ...let us add some circles – called medallions – between the windows on some floors, and to demonstrate sensitive artistry, we find a delicate dangling clothesline of a garland, or a flattened-out meander, or even a gilt star, which is an extremely 'elegant' solution.

Blomstedt himself died prematurely in 1935, aged 35. The significant vehicle for the development of modernism in Finland was his contemporary, Alvar Aalto, who was a friend of Asplund as well as key Swedish architect Sven Markelius. The latter had invited Aalto to join Congrès International d'Architecture Moderne (CIAM), ostensibly run by Le Corbusier. Aalto's reputation as a significant contributor to modernism was endorsed by his involvement in CIAM and by the inclusion of his works in significant architectural journals worldwide as well as significant histories of architecture, notably in the second edition (1949) of Space, Time and Architecture by the secretary-general of CIAM, Sigfried Giedion. Aalto's significant buildings from the early period of Modernism, which basically corresponded to the theoretical principles and architectural aesthetic of Le Corbusier and other modernist architects such as Walter Gropius, include the Turku Sanomat newspaper offices, Turku, Paimio tuberculosis sanatorium (1932) (part of a nationwide campaign for tuberculosis sanatorium construction) and Viipuri Library (1927–35). Central to Functionalism was paying close attention to how the building is used. In the case of the Aalto's Paimio tuberculosis sanatorium, the starting point for the design, he himself claimed, was to make the building itself a contributor to the healing process. Aalto liked to call the building a "medical instrument". For instance, particular attention was paid to the design of the patient bedrooms: these generally held two patients, each with his or her own cupboard and washbasin. Aalto designed special non-splash basins, so that the patient would not disturb the other while washing. The patients spent many hours lying down, and thus Aalto placed the lamps in the room out of the patients line of vision and painted the ceiling a relaxing dark green so as to avoid glare. Each patient had their own specially designed cupboard, fixed to the wall and off the floor so as to aid in cleaning beneath it.

Another key Finnish modernist architect from that period, who had also gone through Nordic Classicism, and who was briefly in partnership with Aalto – working together on the design of the Turku Fair of 1929 – was Erik Bryggman, chief among his own works being Resurrection Chapel (1941) in Turku. However, for Giedion the importance of Aalto led in his move away from high modernism, towards an organic architecture – and as Giedion saw it, the impulse for this lay in the natural formations of Finland. Though these "organic elements" were said to be visible already in these first projects, they became more apparent in Aalto's masterpiece house design, Villa Mairea (1937–1939), in Noormarkku – designed for industrialist Harry Gullichsen and his industrialist-heiress wife Maire Gullichsen – the design for which it is felt took inspiration from Frank Lloyd Wright's Fallingwater (1936–1939), in Pennsylvania, USA. Though even when designing a luxury villa, Aalto argued that he felt Villa Mairea would provide research for building standardisation for social housing.

The shift or transition from Nordic Classicism to Functionalism is said sometimes to have been sudden and revolutionary, as with Aalto's Turku Sanomat newspaper offices and Paimio Sanatorium, which employs such distinct modernist features as use of reinforced concrete construction, steel strip windows and flat roofs. The shift in Aalto's design approach from classicism to modernism is epitomised by the Viipuri Library (1927–35), which went through a transformation from an originally classical competition entry proposal (1927) to the completed high-modernist building, following delays in the project, yet still retaining many of the ideals of the original idea. Traces of Nordic Classicism would naturally continue synthesized with Functionalism and a more idiosyncratic individual style, a well-known example being Erik Bryggman's mature work, the Resurrection Chapel in Turku, dating from as late as 1941. Indeed, in a major study of Finnish architecture during this period, albeit with a particular emphasis on Aalto, Greek historian-theoretician Demetri Porphyrios, in Sources of Modern Eclecticism (1983), argues that the "organic" ordering of Aalto's mature works makes use of the same "heterotopic" ordering – i.e. the juxtaposition of contrary elements – that is evident in the Nordic National Romantic architecture from the end of the 19th and beginning of the 20th century; for example, the works of Eliel Saarinen.

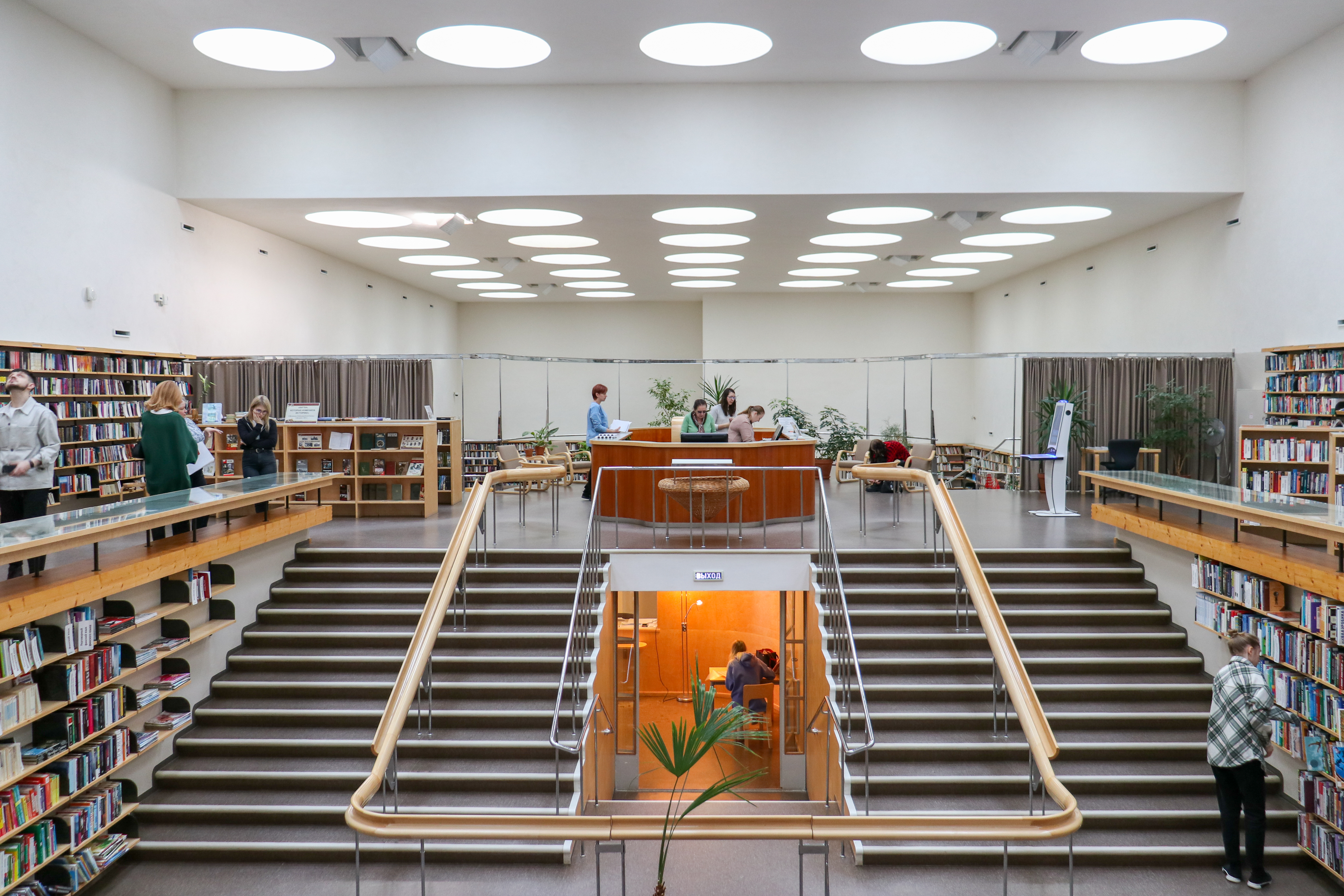
Viipuri Library, Alvar Aalto, 1927–1935.

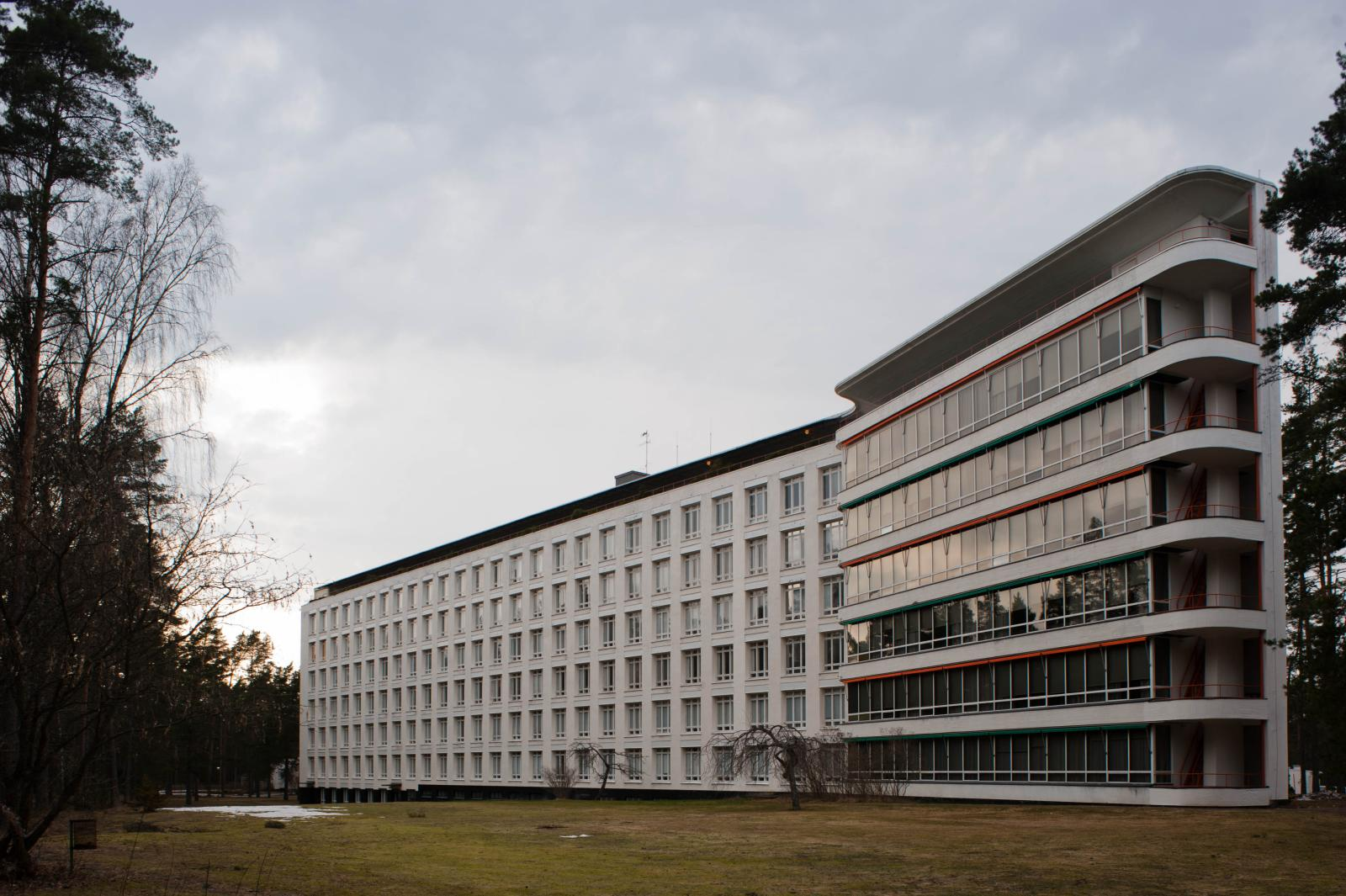
Paimio Sanatorium, Alvar Aalto, 1932.

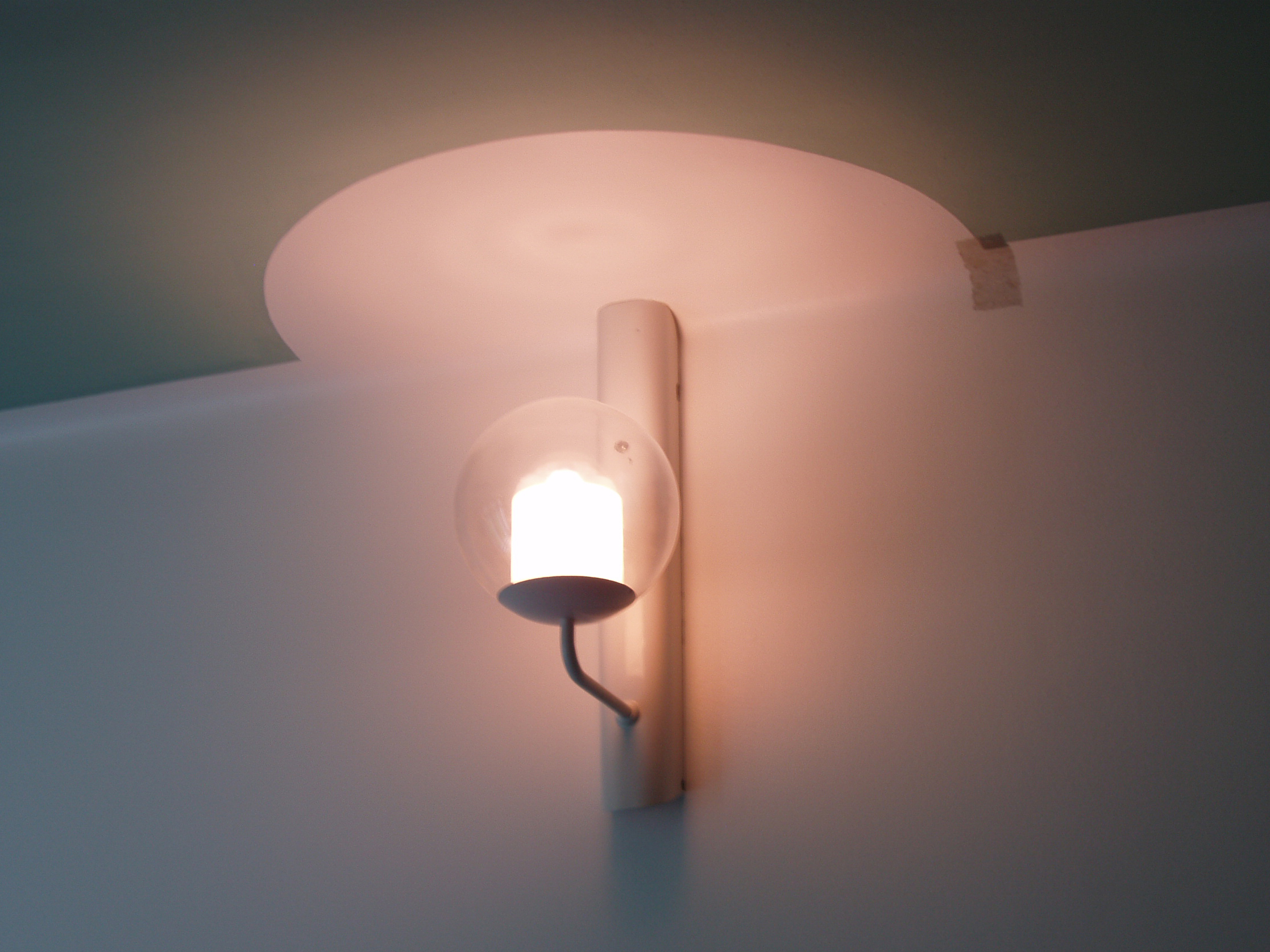
Paimio Sanatorium, patient room ceiling lamp, Alvar Aalto.

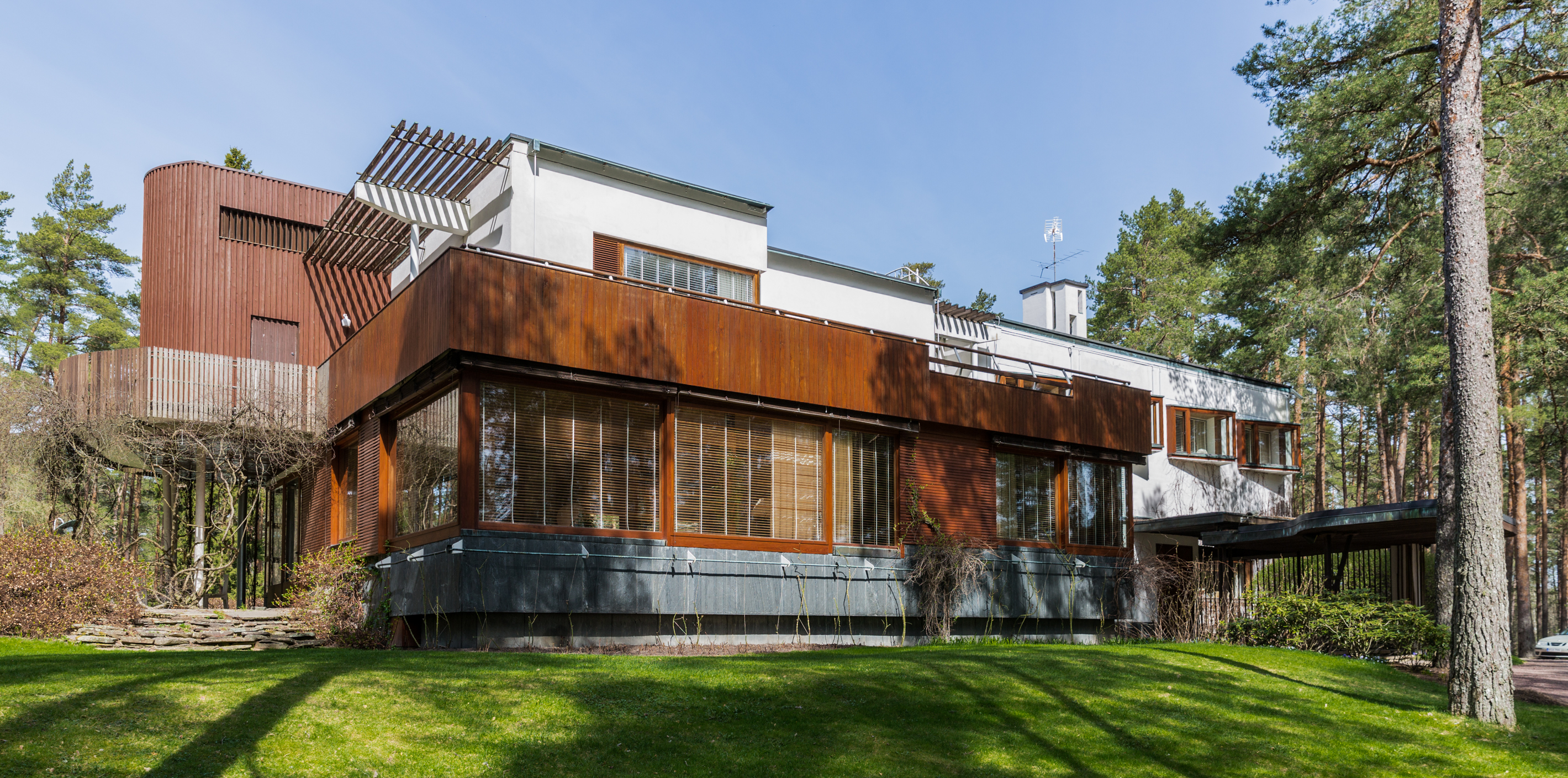
Alvar Aalto, Villa Mairea, Noormarkku, 1938–1939.

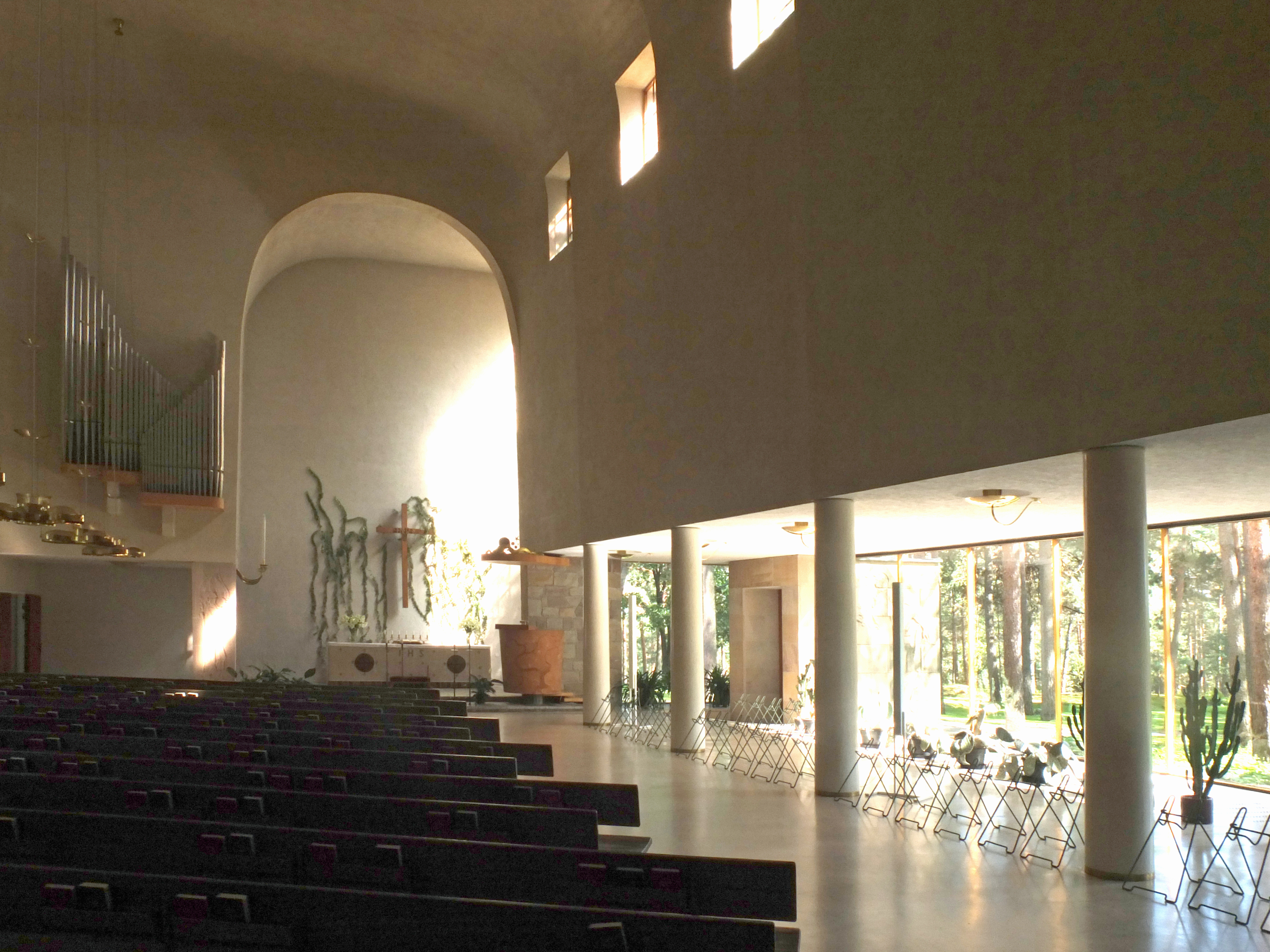
Resurrection Chapel, Turku, Erik Bryggman, 1941.

=== Regional Functionalism ===
A major event that enabled Finland to display its modernist architecture credentials was the Helsinki Olympic Games. Key among the buildings was the Olympic Stadium by architects Yrjö Lindegren and Toivo Jäntti, the first version of which was the result of an architectural competition in 1938, intended for the games due to be held in 1940 (cancelled due to the war), but eventually held in an enlarged stadium in 1952. The importance of the Olympic Games for architecture was that it coupled the modern, white Functionalist architecture with modernisation of the nation, giving it public endorsement; indeed the general public could contribute to the funding of the stadium's construction by purchasing various souvenir trinkets. Other channels by which Functionalist architecture developed was by means of various state architecture offices, such as the military, industry, and to a small extent tourism. A strong "white Functionalism" characterised the mature architecture of Erkki Huttunen, head of the building department of the retail cooperative Suomen Osuuskauppojen Keskuskunta (SOK), as evident in their production works, warehouses, offices and even shops built throughout the country; the first of these was a combined office and warehouse in Rauma (1931), with white-rendered walls, roof terrace with "ship railing" balustrade, large street-level windows and curved access stairs. The Ministry of Defence had its own building-architecture department, and during the 1930s many of the military's buildings were designed in the "white Functionalism" style. Two examples were the Viipuri military hospital and Tilkka military hospital in Helsinki (1936), both designed by Olavi Sortta. Following independence there was a growing tourism industry with an emphasis on experiencing the wilderness of Lapland: the fashionable white Functionalist architecture of the Hotel Pohjanhovi in Rovaniemi by Pauli E. Blomstedt (1936, destroyed in the Lapland War in 1944) catered to the growing middle-class Finnish tourists as well as foreign tourists to Lapland, though at the same time more modest hostels designed in a vernacular rustic style were also being built.

Following World War II, Finland ceded 11% of its territory and 30% of its economic assets to the Soviet Union as part of the Moscow Peace Treaty of 1940. Also 12% of Finland's population, including some 422,000 Karelians, were evacuated. The state response to this has become known as the period of reconstruction. Reconstruction started in the rural areas because still at that time two-thirds of the population lived there. But reconstruction involved not only the repair of war damage (e.g., the destruction of the city of Rovaniemi by the retreating German army) but also the beginnings of greater urbanisation, programmes for standardised housing, building programmes for schools, hospitals, universities and other public service buildings, as well as the construction of new industries and power stations. For instance, architect Aarne Ervi was responsible for the design of five power stations along the Oulujoki river in the decade after the war, and Alvar Aalto designed several industrial complexes following the war, though in fact he had been heavily involved in designing projects of various sizes for Finnish industrial enterprises already since the 1930s. However, for all the expansion of public works, the decade following the war was marred by shortages in building materials, except for wood. The Finnish Lutheran Church also became a key figure in architecture in the interim and post-war period by arranging with the Finnish Association of Architects (SAFA) architectural competitions for the design of new churches and cemeteries/cemetery chapels throughout the country, and significant war-time and post-war examples include: Turku Resurrection Chapel (Erik Bryggman, 1941), Lahti Church (Alvar Aalto, 1950), Vuoksenniska Church (Alvar Aalto, 1952–1957), Vatiala Cemetery Chapel, Tampere (Viljo Rewell, 1960), Hyvinkää Church (Aarno Ruusuvuori, 1960), and Holy Cross Chapel, Turku (Pekka Pitkänen, 1967). Bryggman in particular designed several cemetery chapels but also was the most prolific designer of war graves, designed in conjunction with artists.

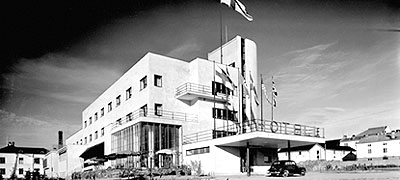
Hotel Pohjanhovi, Rovaniemi, Pauli E. Blomstedt, 1936 (destroyed 1944).

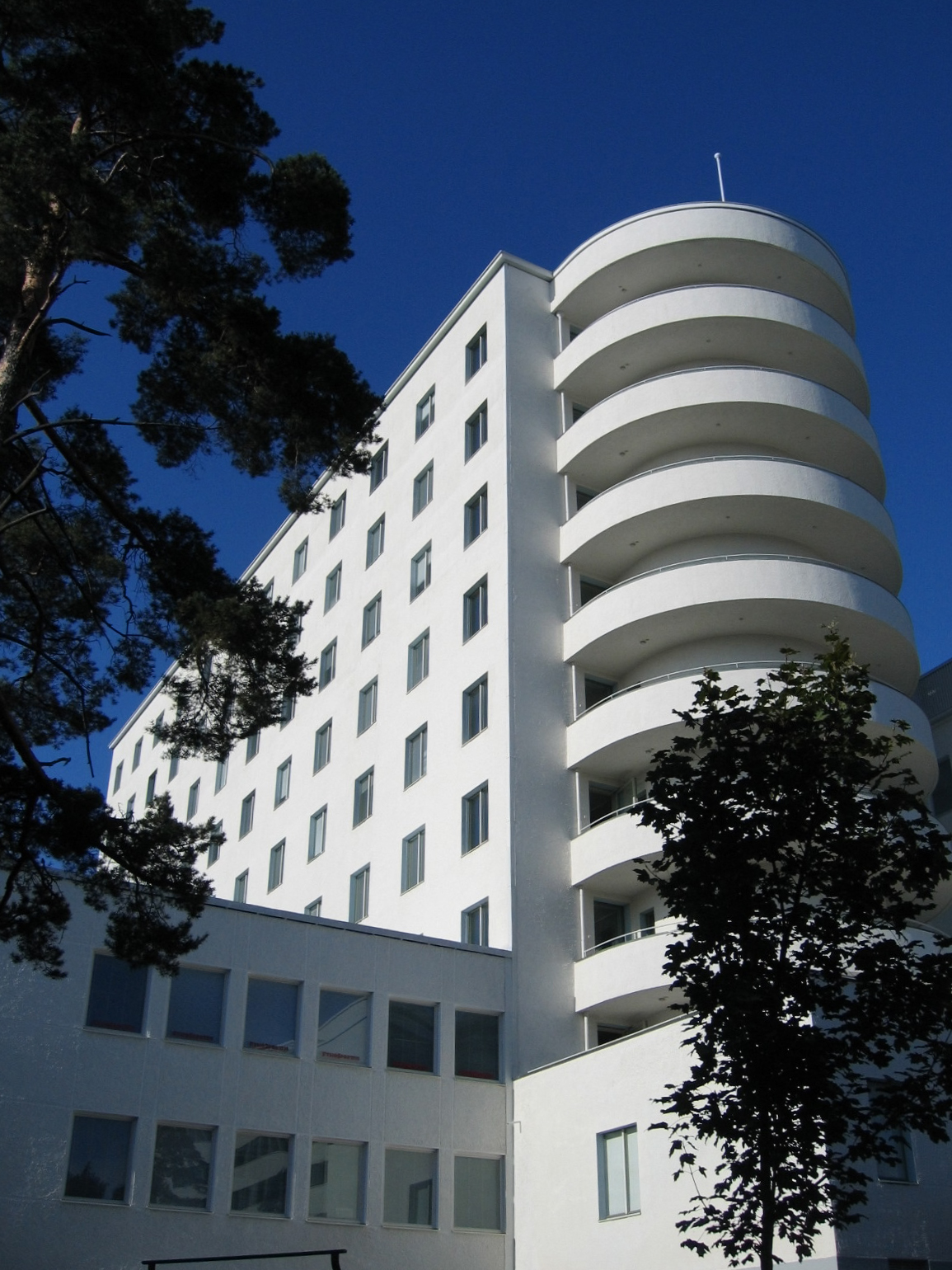
Tilkka military hospital, Helsinki, Olavi Sortta, 1936.

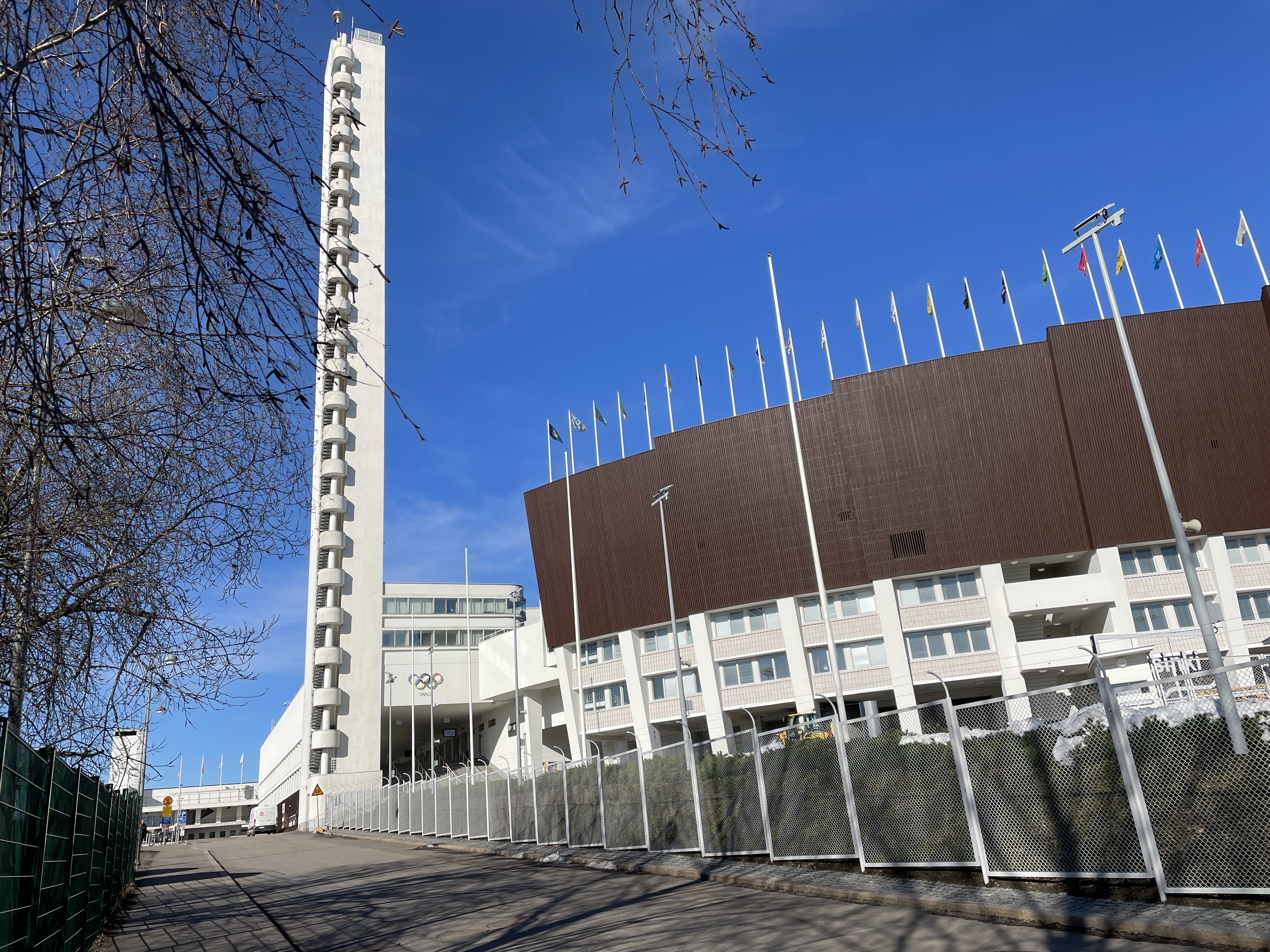
Helsinki Olympic Stadium, Lindegren and Jäntti, 1938–1950.

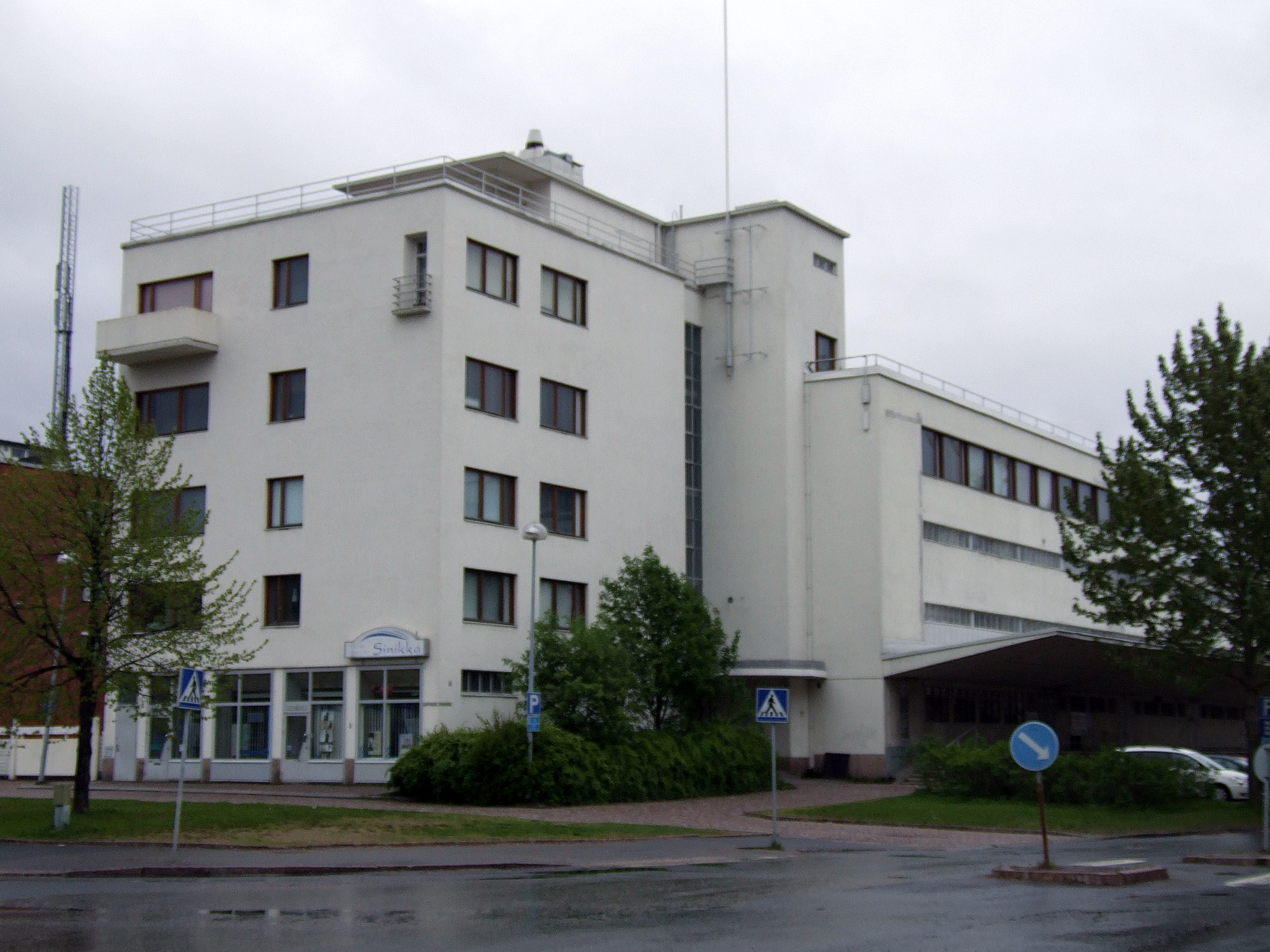
SOK offices and warehouse, Oulu, Erkki Huttunen, 1938.

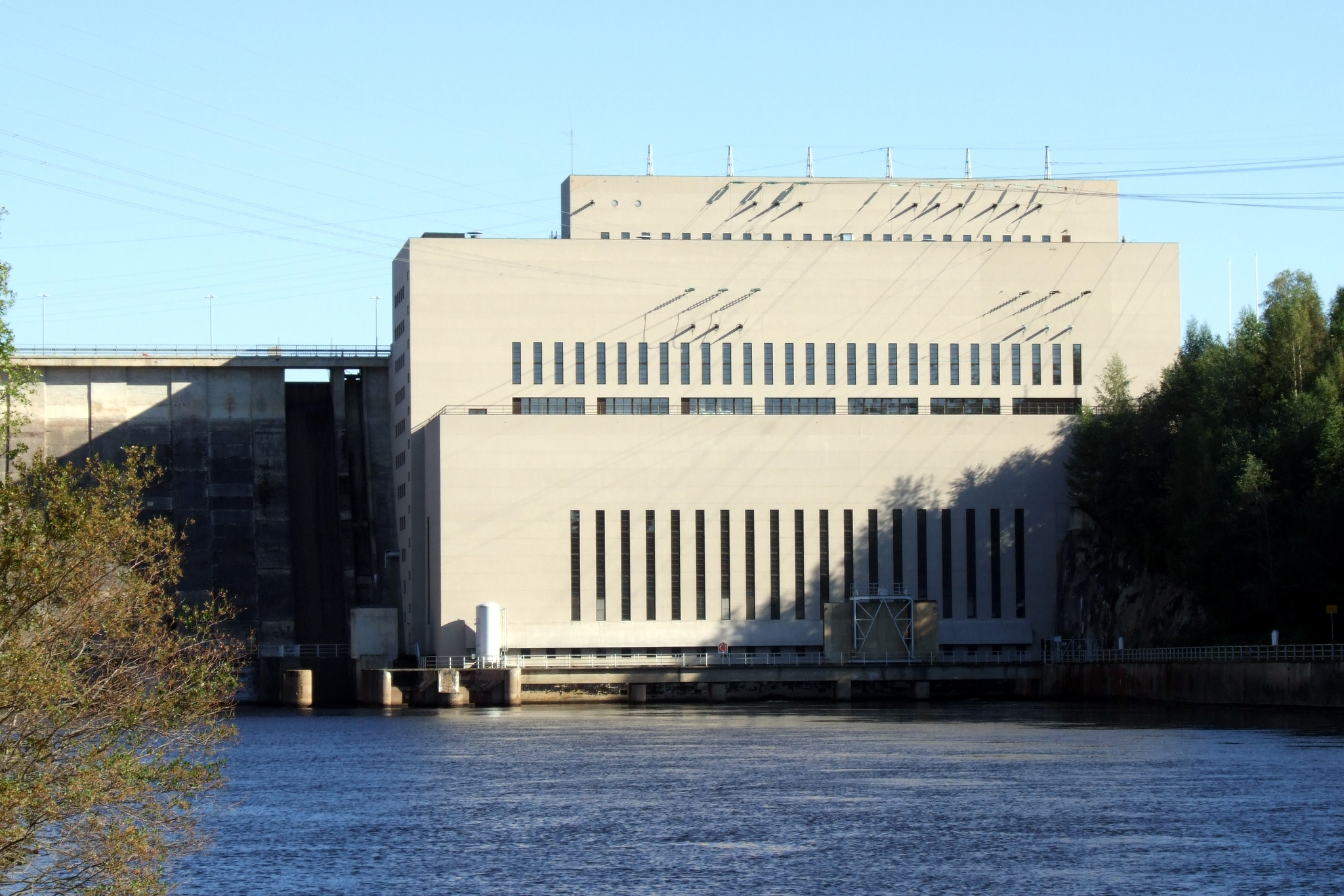
Pyhakoski Power Station, Aarne Ervi, 1942–1951.

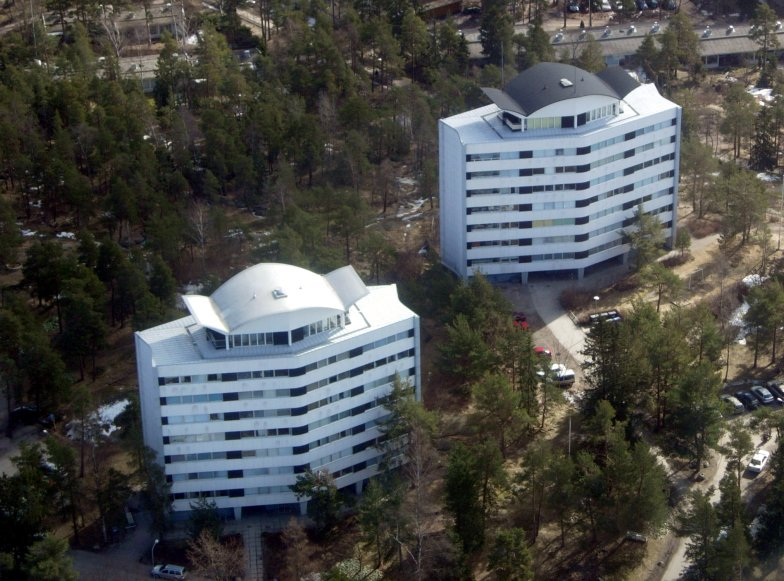
High rise blocks, Tapiola, Viljo Revell, 1953.

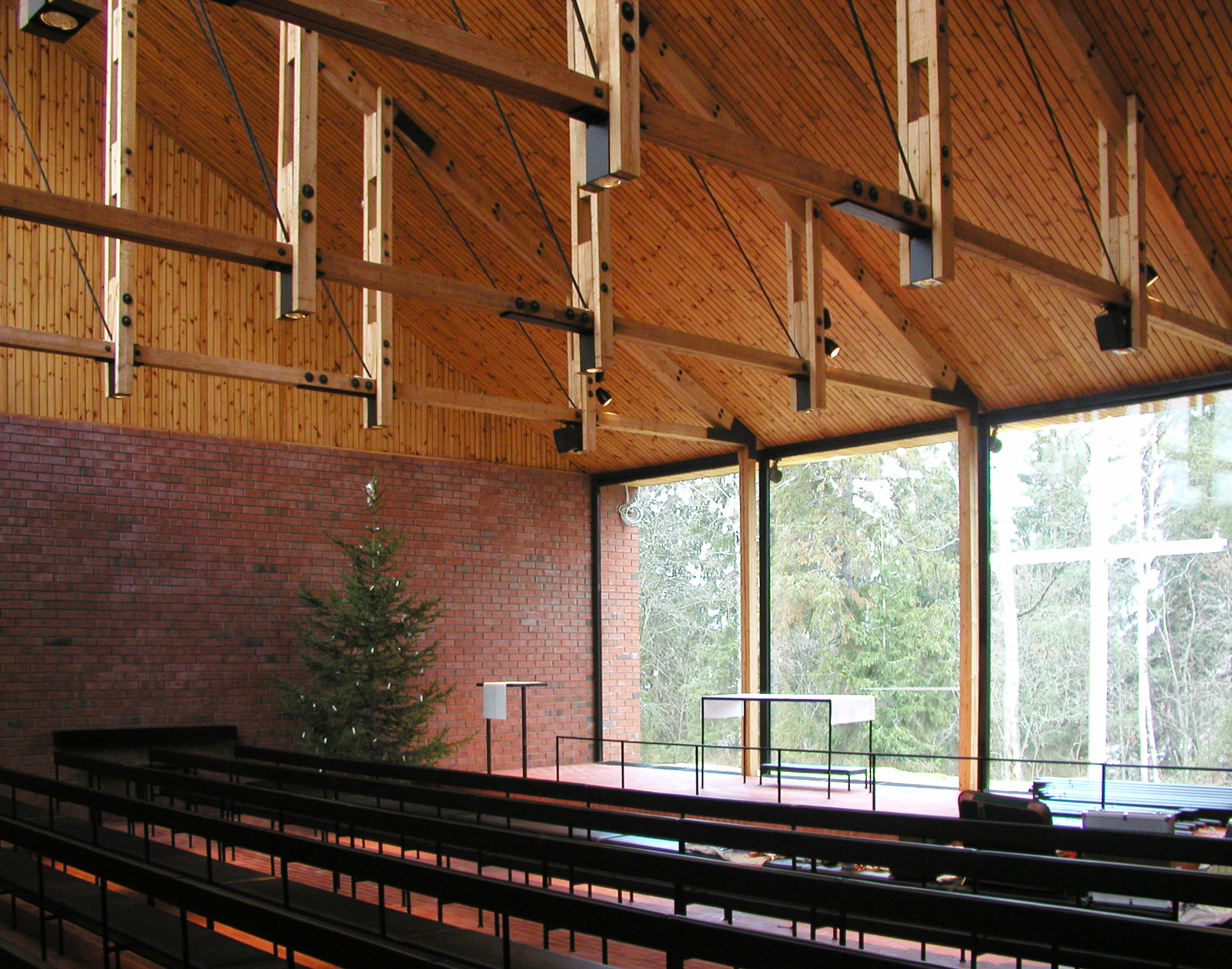
Otaniemi Chapel, Espoo, Kaija Siren (with Heikki Siren), 1954–1957.

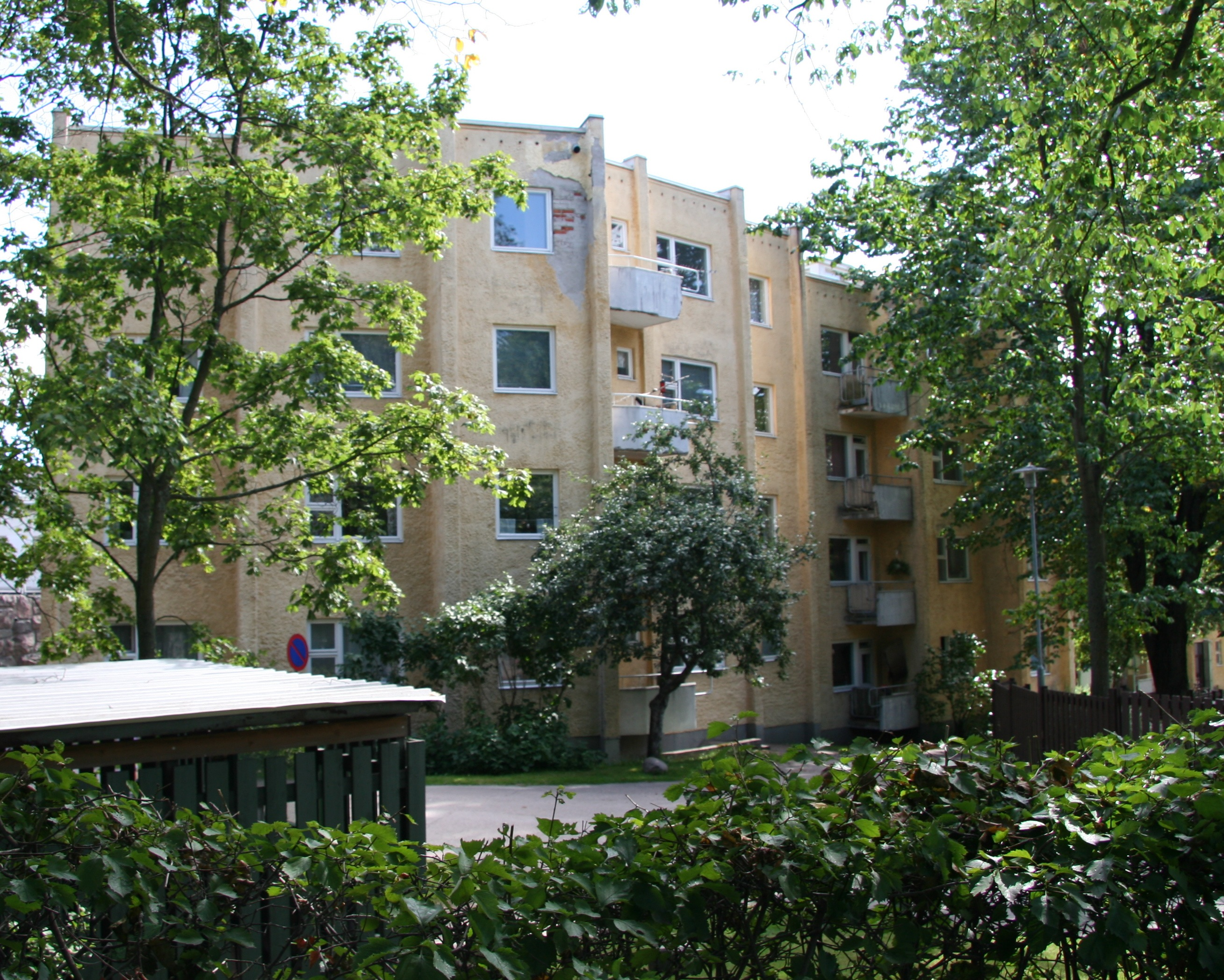
"Serpentine House" housing block, Helsinki, Yrjö Lindegren, 1949–1951.

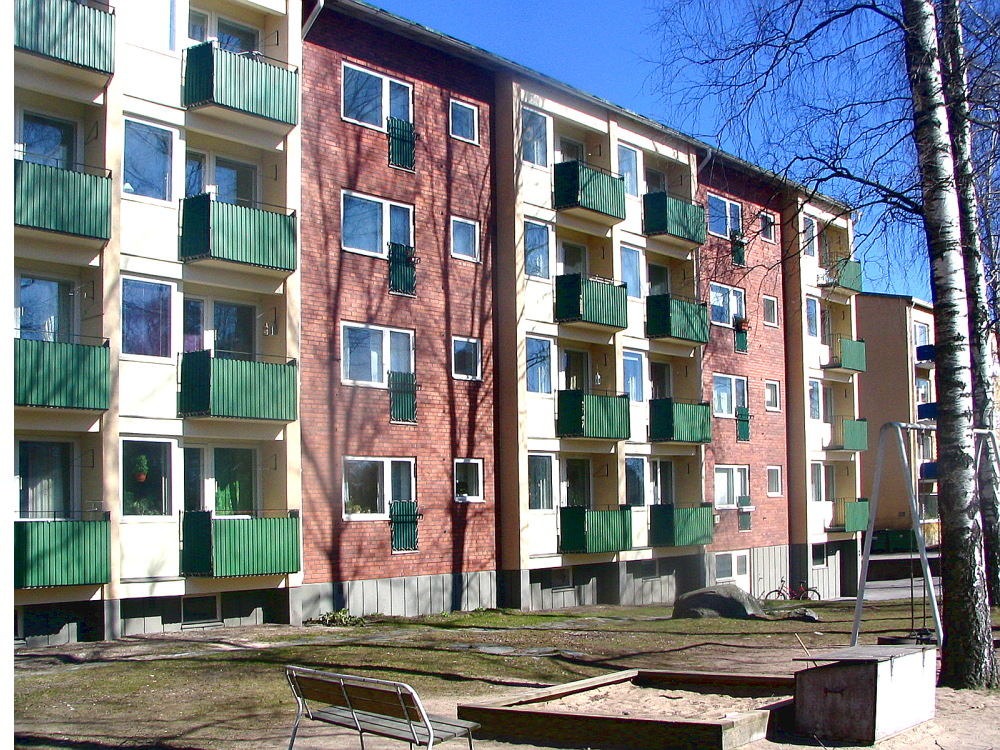
Roihuvuori housing area, Helsinki, Hilding Ekelund, 1957.

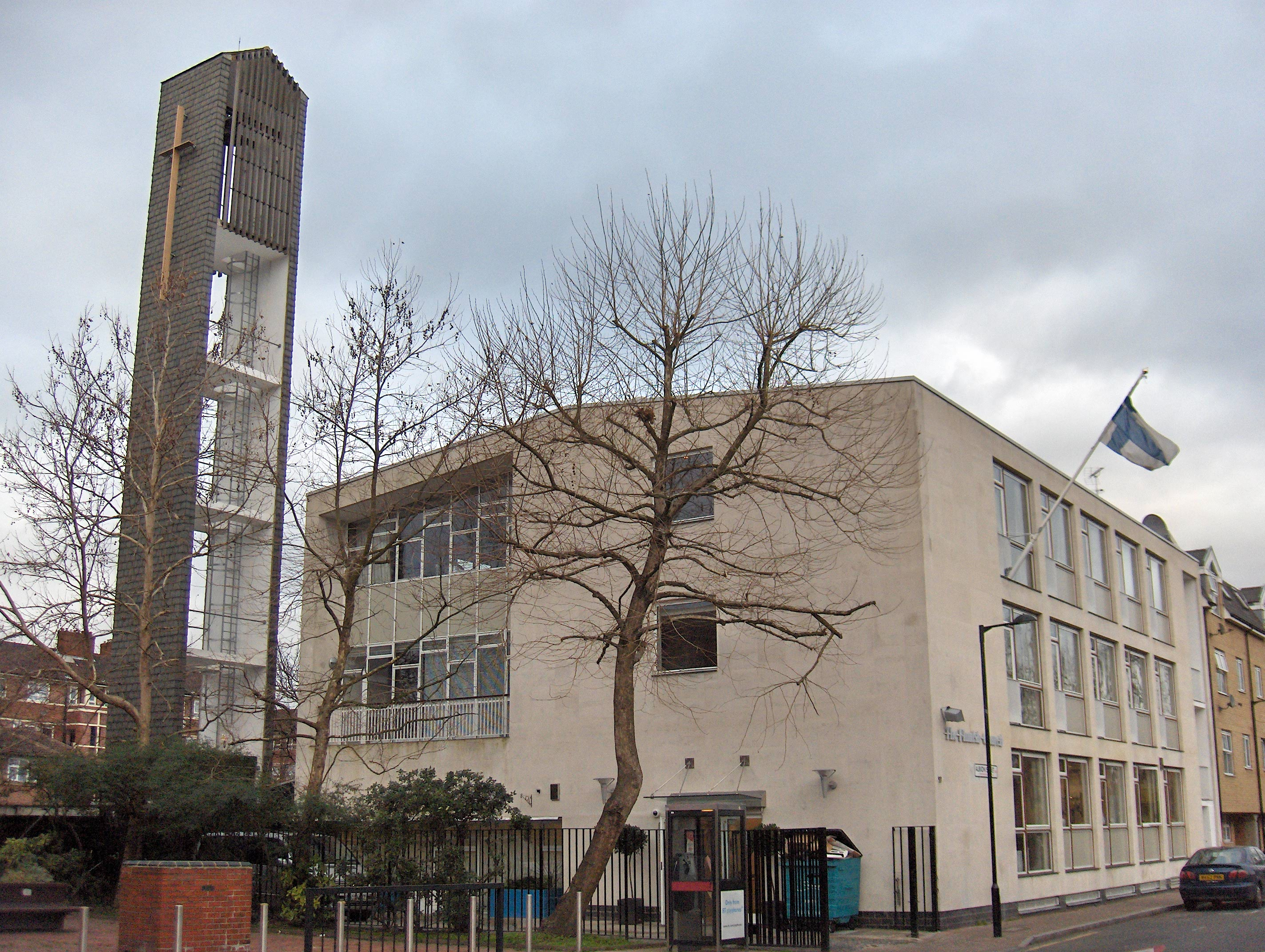
Finnish Church, London, Cyril Mardall-Sjöström, 1958.

The 1950s also marked the beginning not only of greater population migration to the cities but also state financed projects for social housing. A key early example is the so-called "Käärmetalo" (literally "Snake house", though usually referred to in English as the "Serpentine house"), (1949–1951) by Yrjö Lindegren; built using traditional building techniques, plastered brick, the building nevertheless has a modern snake-like form that follows the topography of the area whilst also creating small pocket-like yards for the residents. But beyond the matter of form, was the production of mass housing based on systems of standardisation and prefabricated element construction. A leader in the design of social housing was Hilding Ekelund – who had previously been responsible for the design of the athletes' village for the Olympic Games.

A challenge to the traditional urbanisation process came, however, with the design of "forest towns", high-rise developments set in forested areas on the outskirts of the major cities, such as the Pihlajamäki suburb of Helsinki (1959–1965), based on a town plan by Olli Kivinen, and building designs by Lauri Silvennoinen, the area comprising white Functionalist-style 9-storey tower blocks and up to 250-metre-long 4–5-storey "lamella" blocks dispersed within a forest setting. Pihlajamäki was also one of the first precast concrete construction projects in Finland. The major example of the goal to set living within nature was Tapiola garden city, located in Espoo, promoted by its founder Heikki von Hertzen to encourage social mobility. The town planning for the garden city was made by Otto-Iivari Meurman, and with the key buildings of the town centre by Aarne Ervi, and other buildings by, among others, Aulis Blomstedt and Viljo Revell.

In the 1950s and 1960s, as the Finnish economy began to prosper with greater industrialisation, the state began to consolidate a welfare state, building more hospitals, schools, universities and sports facilities (athletics being a sport Finland had proved successful in internationally). Also larger businesses would have architectural policies, notably the dairy company Valio, in constructing rational high-tech factories and later, their headquarters (Helsinki, 1975–1978) by their own architect Matti K. Mäkinen, together with architect Kaarina Löfström. There was, however, a flip side to the urbanization and the expressed concern for the value of nature; traditional towns, even the old medieval ones, such as Porvoo and Rauma, were under threat of being demolished, to be replaced by straightened streets and large urban developments of prefabricated multi-storey blocks. This did indeed happen to an extent in Turku – where the wholesale redevelopment was described as the "Turku Disease" – as well as Helsinki and Tampere; however the latter two did not have medieval architecture at all and even Turku had lost the majority of its medieval building entities at the great fire in 1827. Anyway, the "old town" areas of Porvoo and Rauma were saved, the wooden old town of Rauma, Old Rauma, eventually becoming a UNESCO World Heritage site.

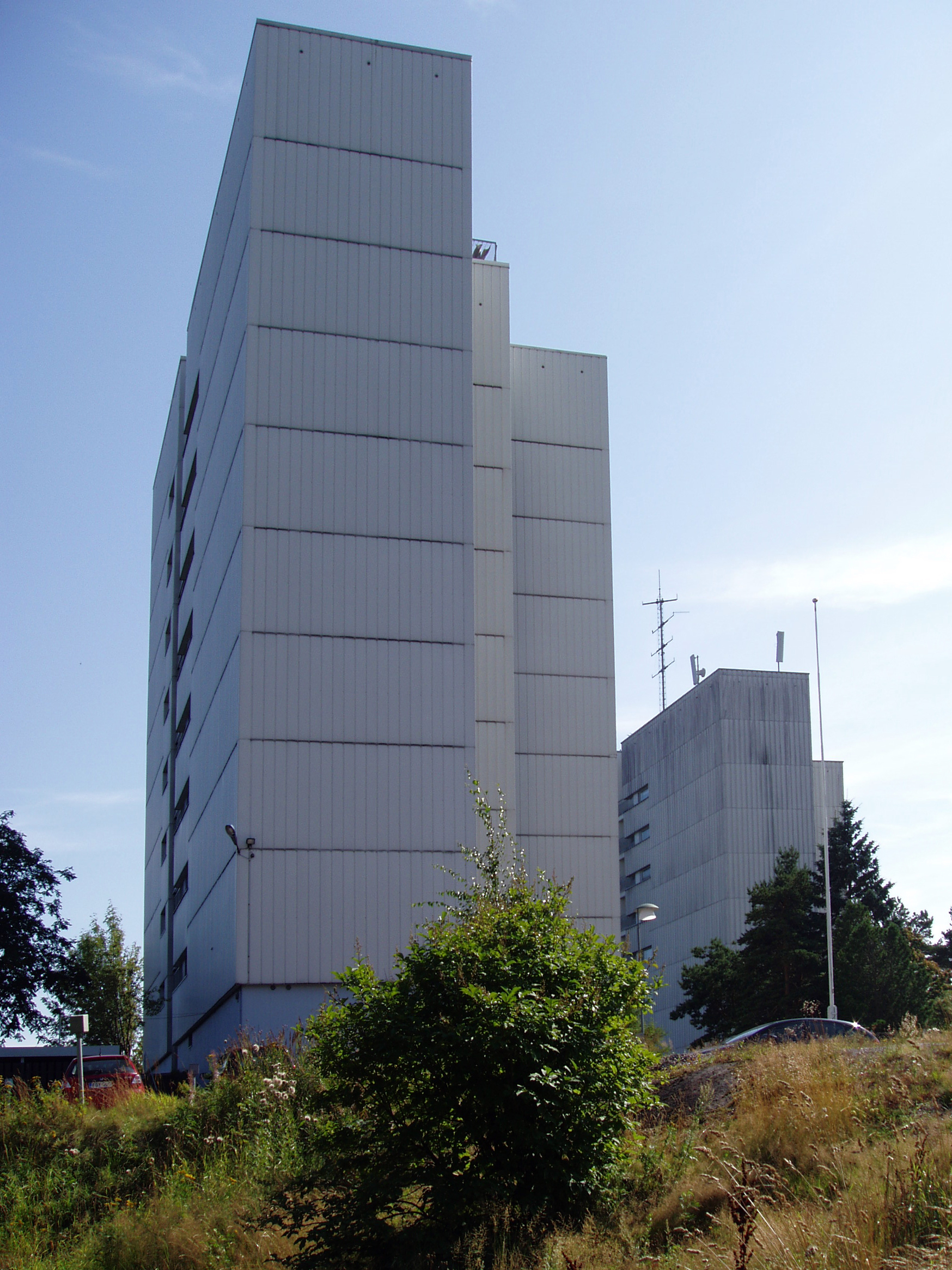
Pihlajamäki towers, Helsinki, Lauri Silvennoinen.

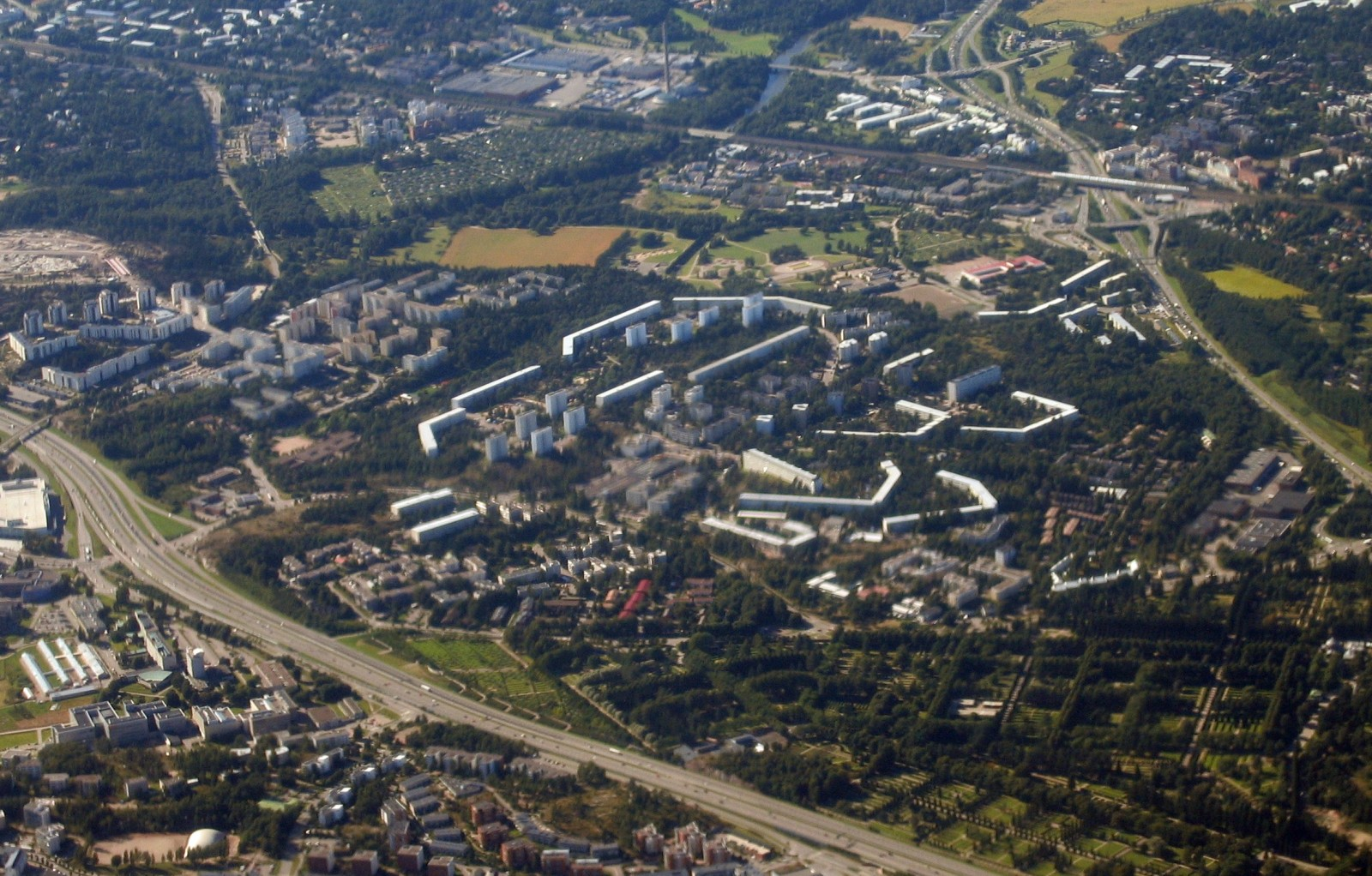
Pihlajamäki: Olli Kivinen (town plan), Lauri Silvennoinen, Esko Korhonen and Sulo Savolainen (architecture)

Pihlajamäki housing area, Helsinki (1959–65)

There was also at this time more disposable income; one outlet for this was the growth in the number of leisure homes – previously the preserve of the very wealthy – preferably placed alone on one of the numerous isolated lakesides or the coastal waterfront. An essential part of the leisure home (occupied for summer holidays and intermittently during the spring and autumn, but close up for the winter) has been the sauna, usually as a separate building. Indeed, the sauna had traditionally been a rural phenomenon, and its popularity in modern homes was a consequence of its growth as a leisure-time activity rather than as a washing facility. The Finnish Association of Architects (SAFA) and commercial companies organised design competitions for standardised models of leisure homes and saunas, preferably built in wood. Architects could also use the summer house type and sauna as an opportunity to experiment, an opportunity that many architects still use today. In terms of size and opulence, Aalto's own summer house, the so-called Experimental House, in Muuratsalo (1952–1953) fell between the traditions of middle-class splendor and modest rusticity, while its accompanying lakeside sauna, built from round logs, was a modern application of rustic construction. The 1960s witnessed more experimental summer house types, designed with the objective of serial production. The most noted of these was Matti Suuronen's Futuro House (1968) and Venturo House (1971), of which several were made and sold worldwide. Their success was short-lived, however, as production was hit by the 1970s energy crisis.

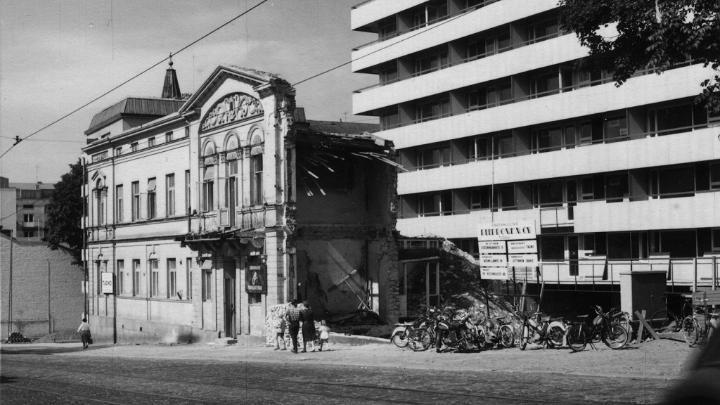
"Turku Disease": radical change in the townscape, early 1960s.

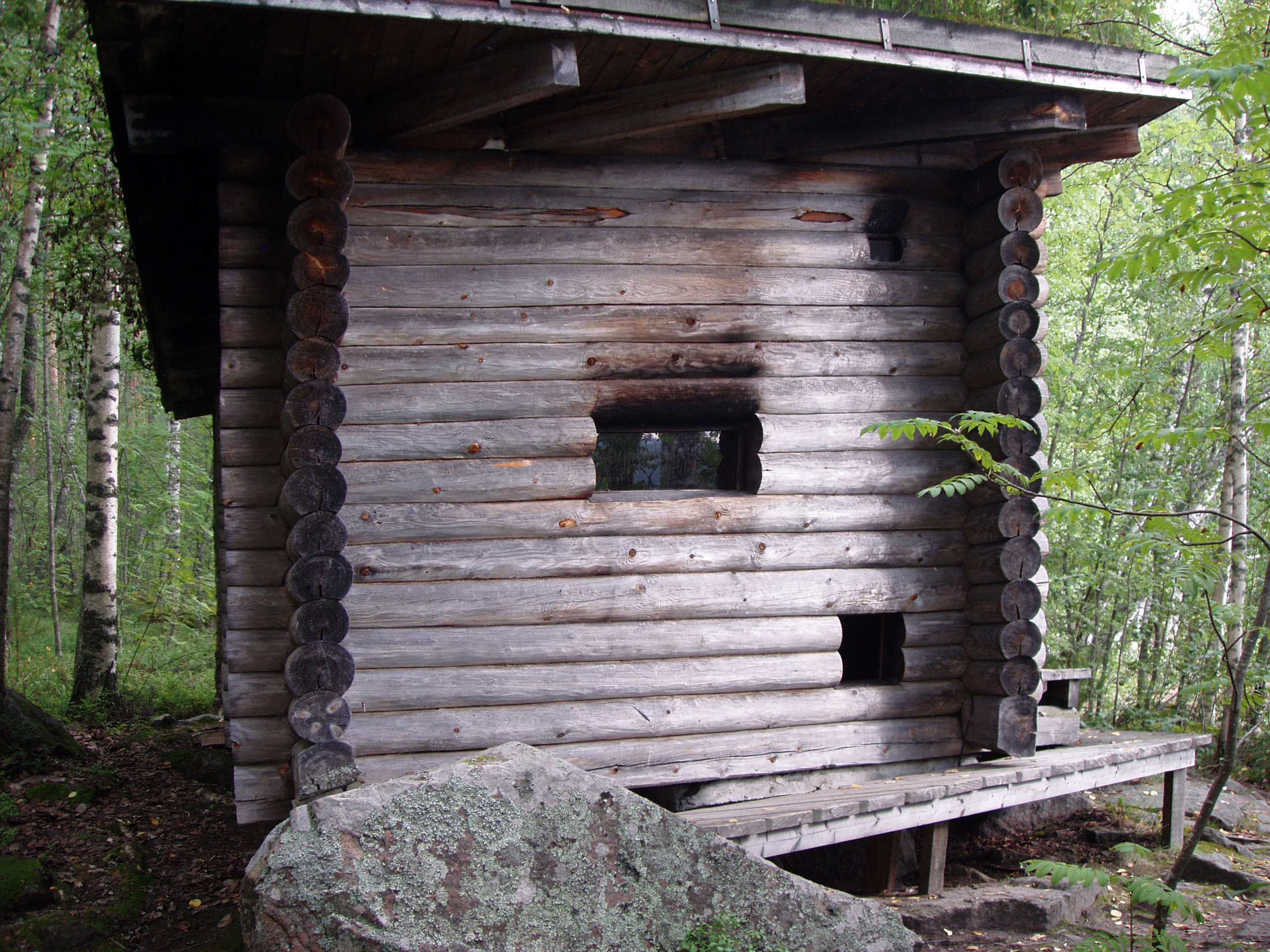
Muuratsalo sauna, Alvar Aalto, c. 1952.

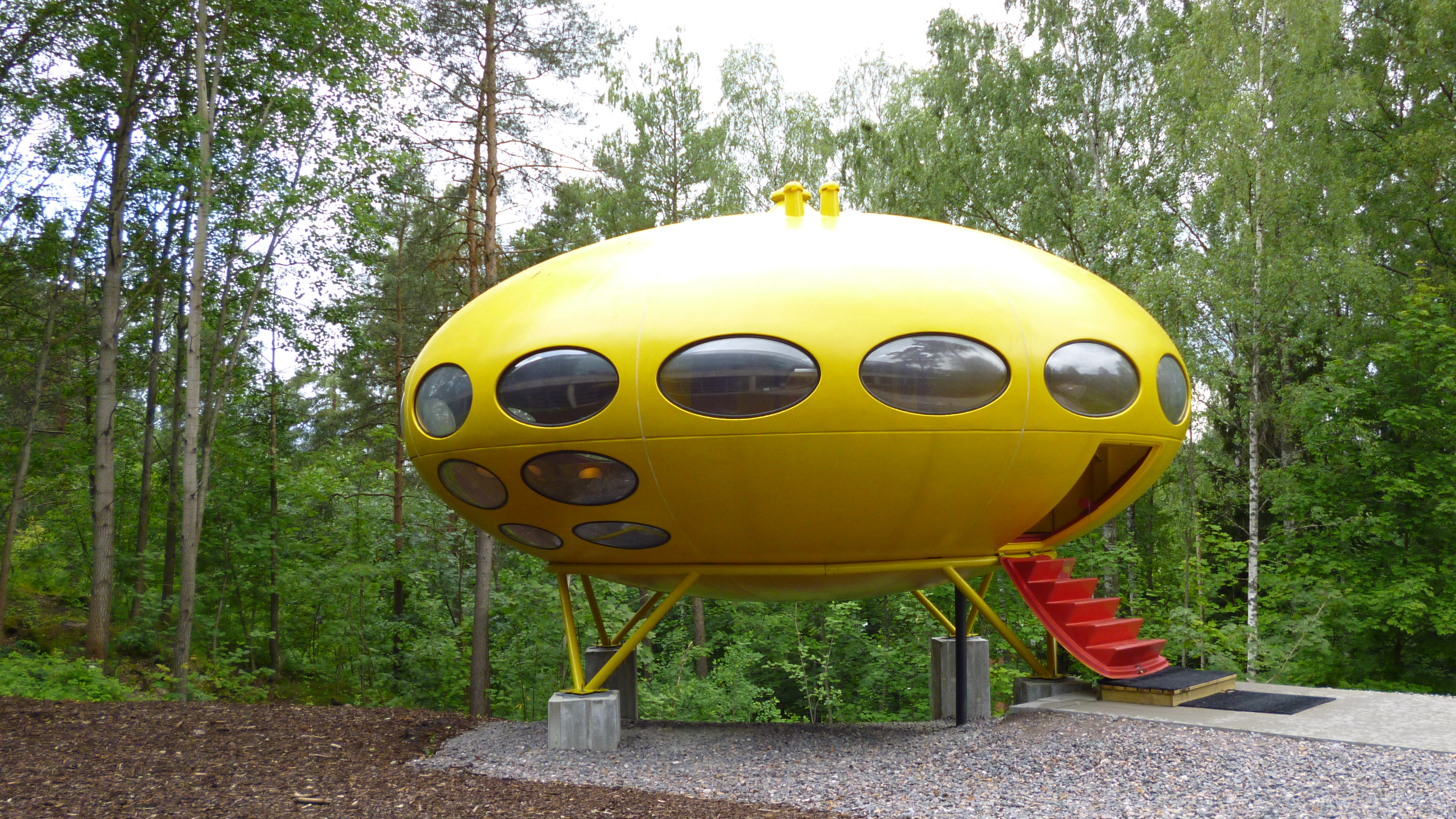
Futuro House (1968), Matti Suuronen.

The late 1950s and 1960s also witnessed a reaction to the then still dominant position of Alvar Aalto in Finnish architecture, though some, most significantly Heikki and Kaija Siren (e.g., Otaniemi Chapel, 1956–1957), Keijo Petäjä (e.g., Lauttasaari Church, Helsinki, 1958), Viljo Revell (e.g., Toronto City Hall, Canada, 1958–1965), Timo Penttilä (e.g., Helsinki City Theatre, 1967), Marjatta and Martti Jaatinen (e.g., Kannelmäki church, 1962–68), and brothers Timo and Tuomo Suomalainen (e.g., Temppeliaukio Church, Helsinki, 1961–1969) developed their own interpretation of a non-rationalist modernist architecture. Taking architecture in an even more idiosyncratic organic line than Aalto was Reima Pietilä, while at the other end of the spectrum was a rationalist line epitomized in the works of Aarne Ervi, Aulis Blomstedt, Aarno Ruusuvuori, Kirmo Mikkola, Kristian Gullichsen, Matti K. Mäkinen, Pekka Salminen, Juhani Pallasmaa and, slightly later, Helin & Siitonen Architects.

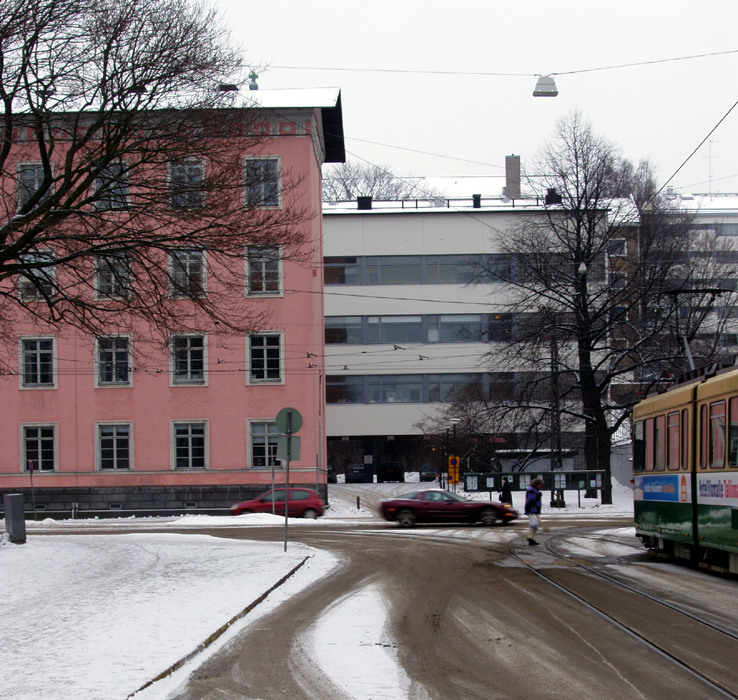
Extension to Adult Education Centre, Helsinki (Taucher, 1927) (1959), Aulis Blomstedt

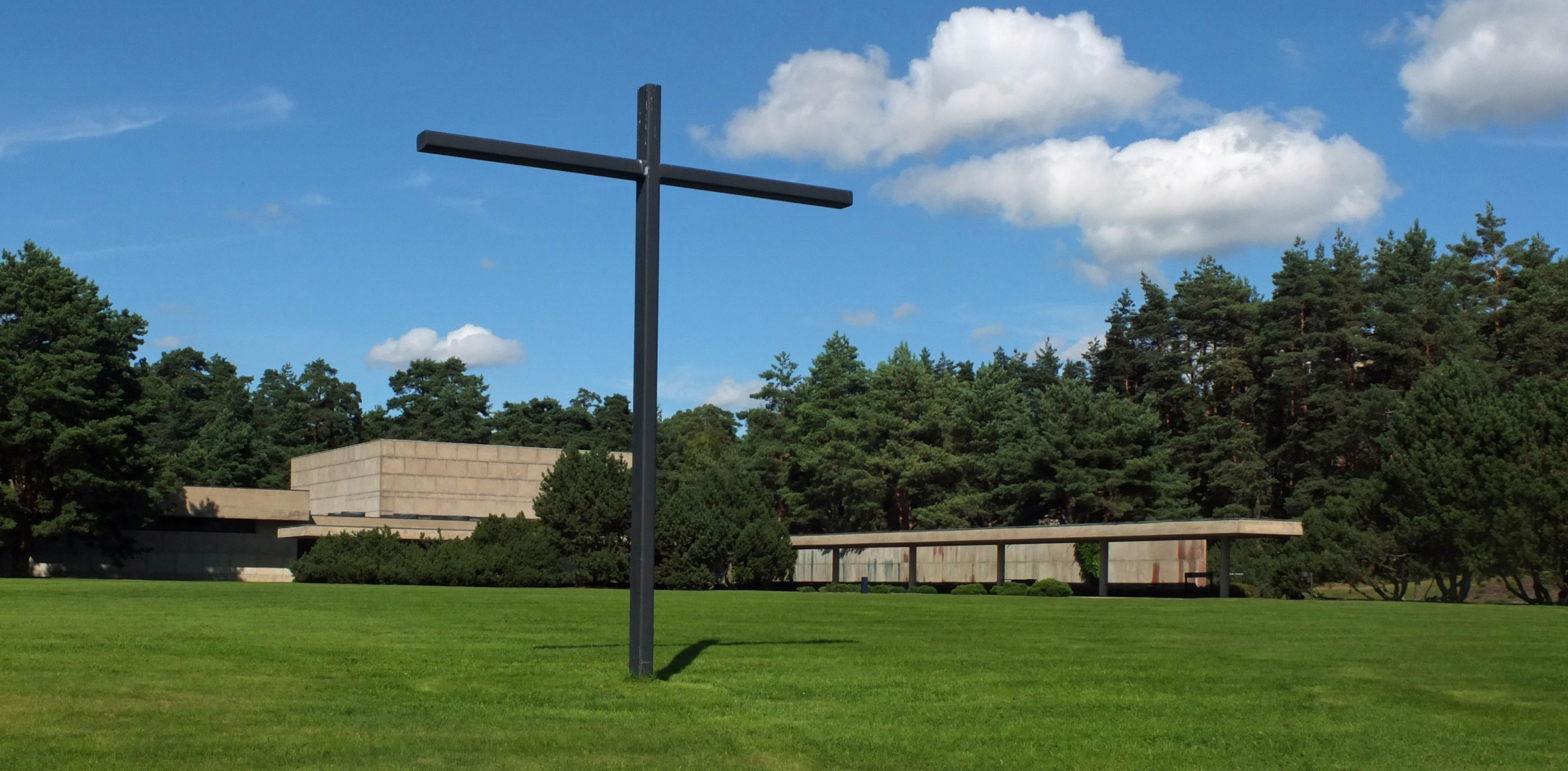
Holy Cross Chapel, Turku (1967), Pekka Pitkänen.

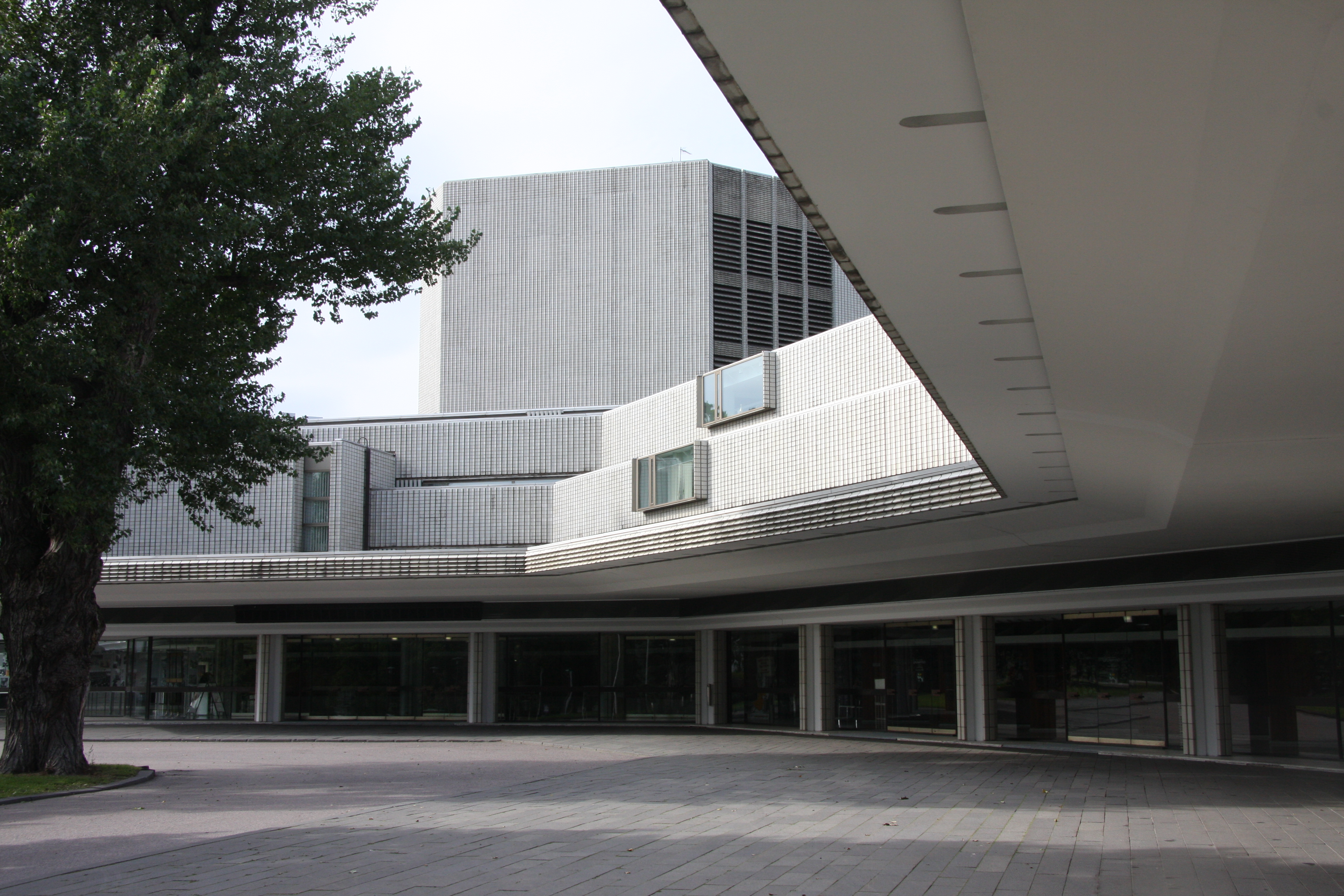
Helsinki City Theatre (1967), Timo Penttilä.

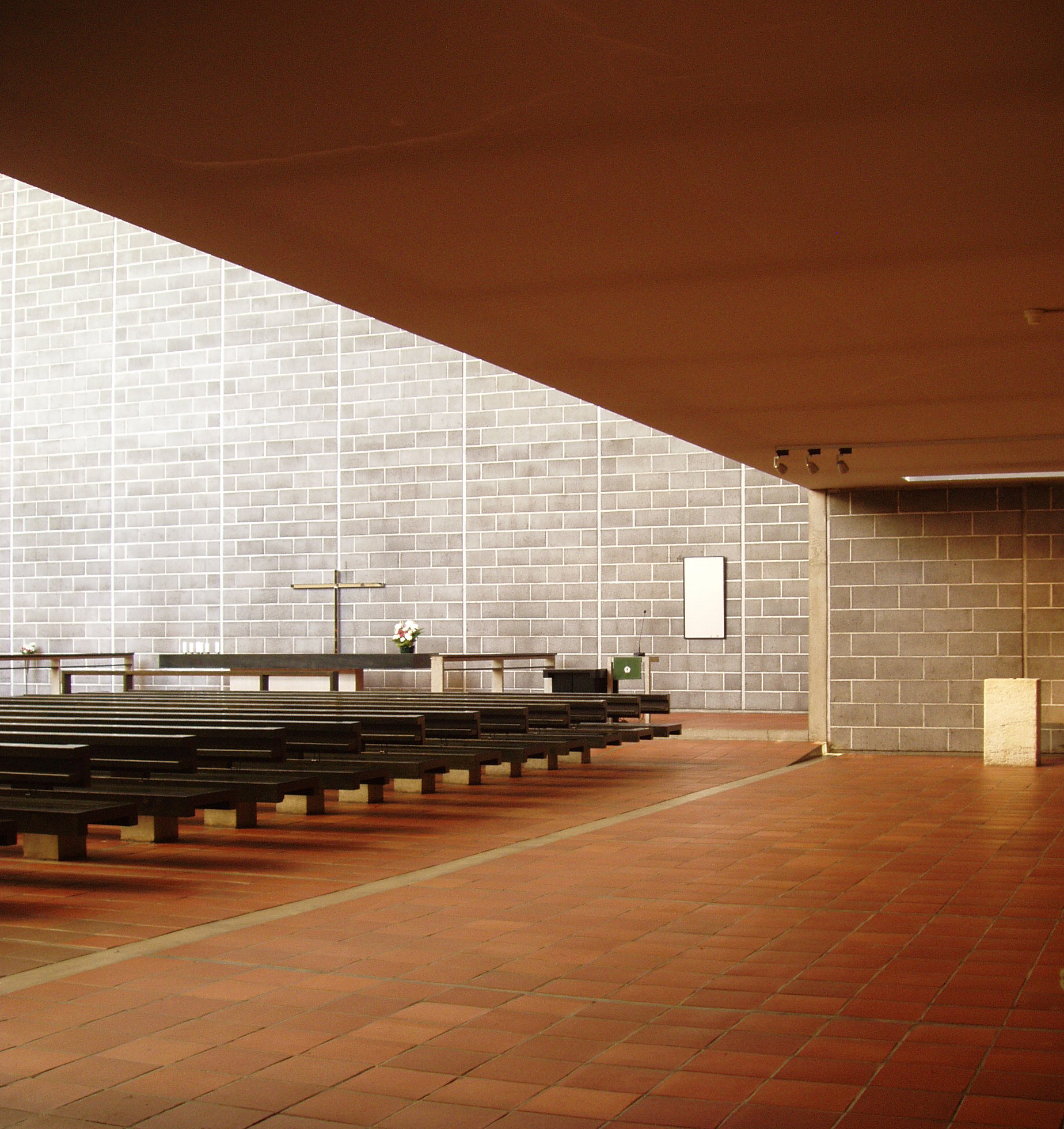
Tapiola church, Espoo (1965), Aarno Ruusuvuori.

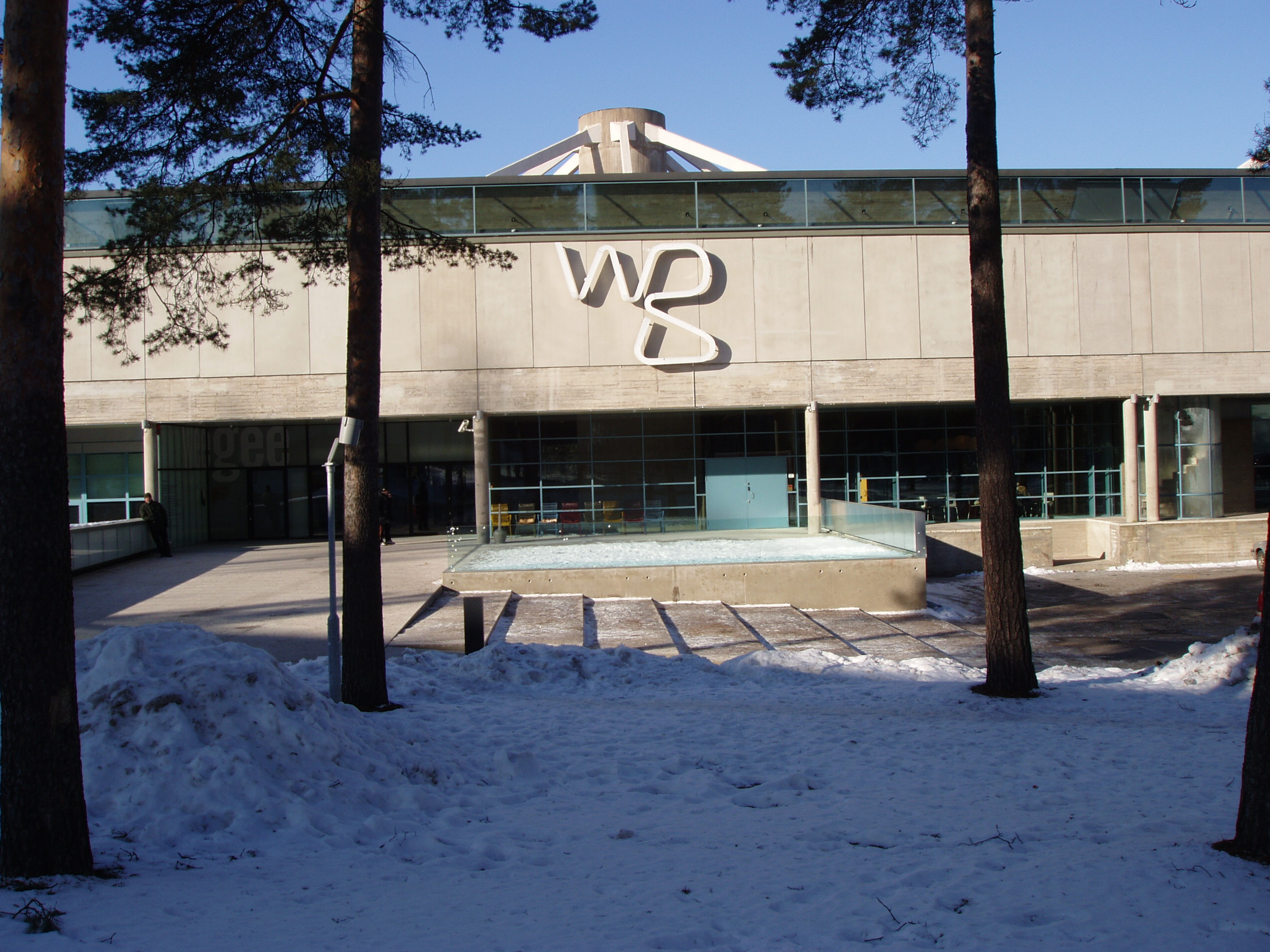
Weilin & Göös Print Works, Espoo (1964–1966), Aarno Ruusuvuori.

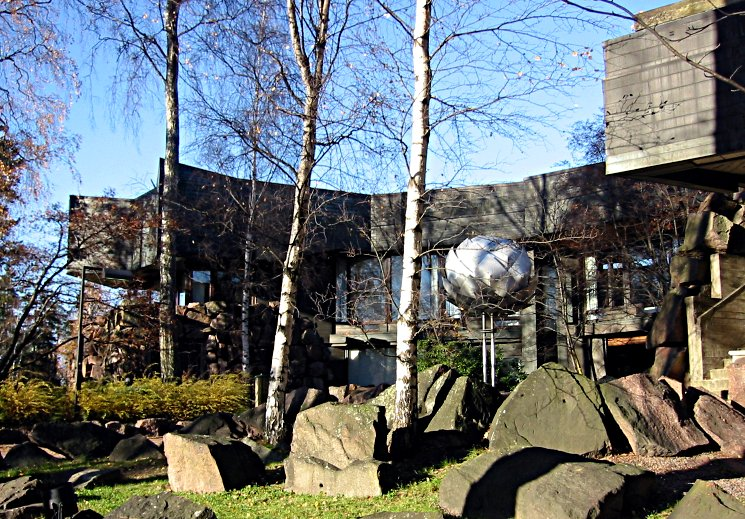
Dipoli student building, Espoo (1961–1966), Reima Pietilä and Raili Pietilä.

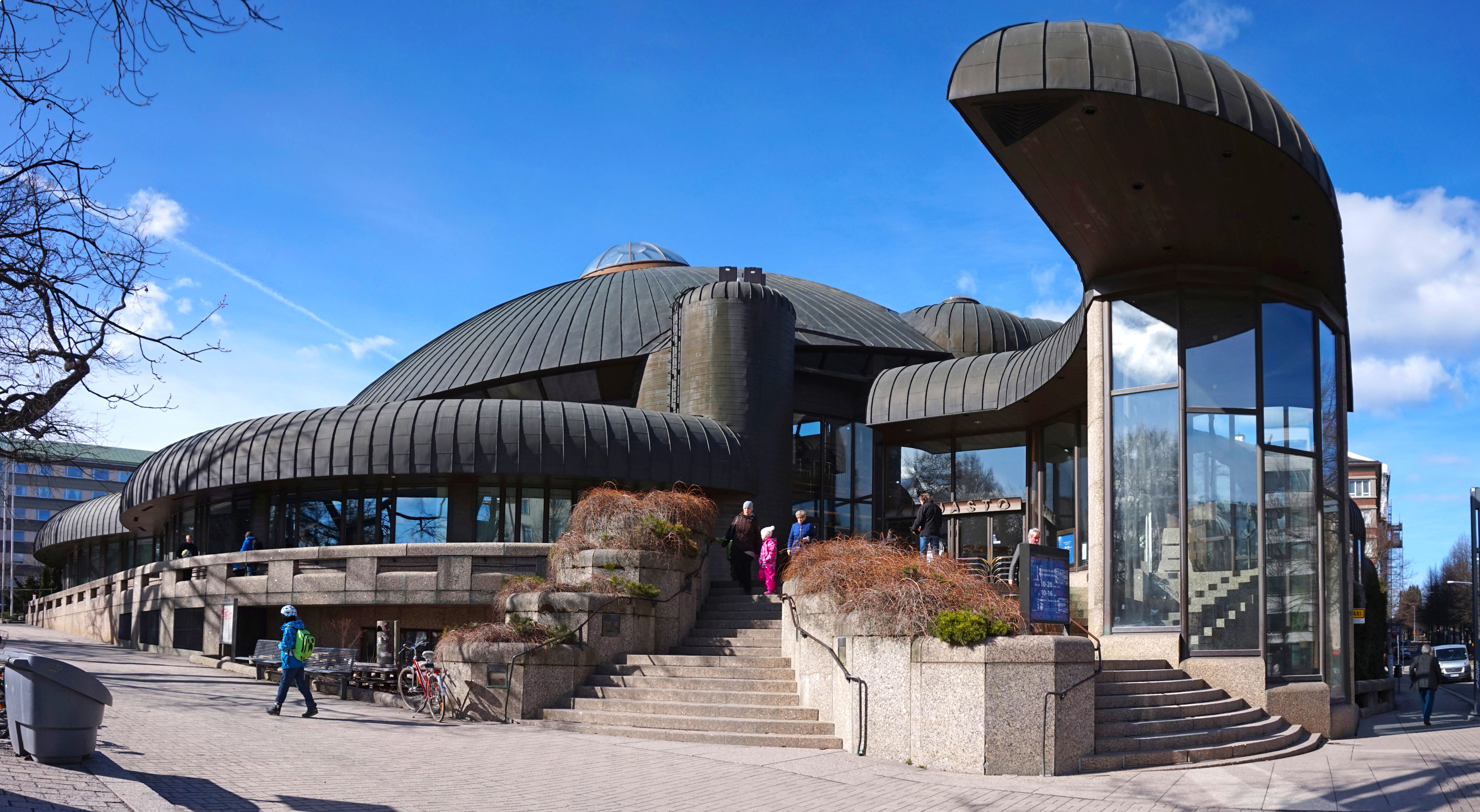
'Metso' Tampere City Library (1978–1986), Reima and Raili Pietilä.

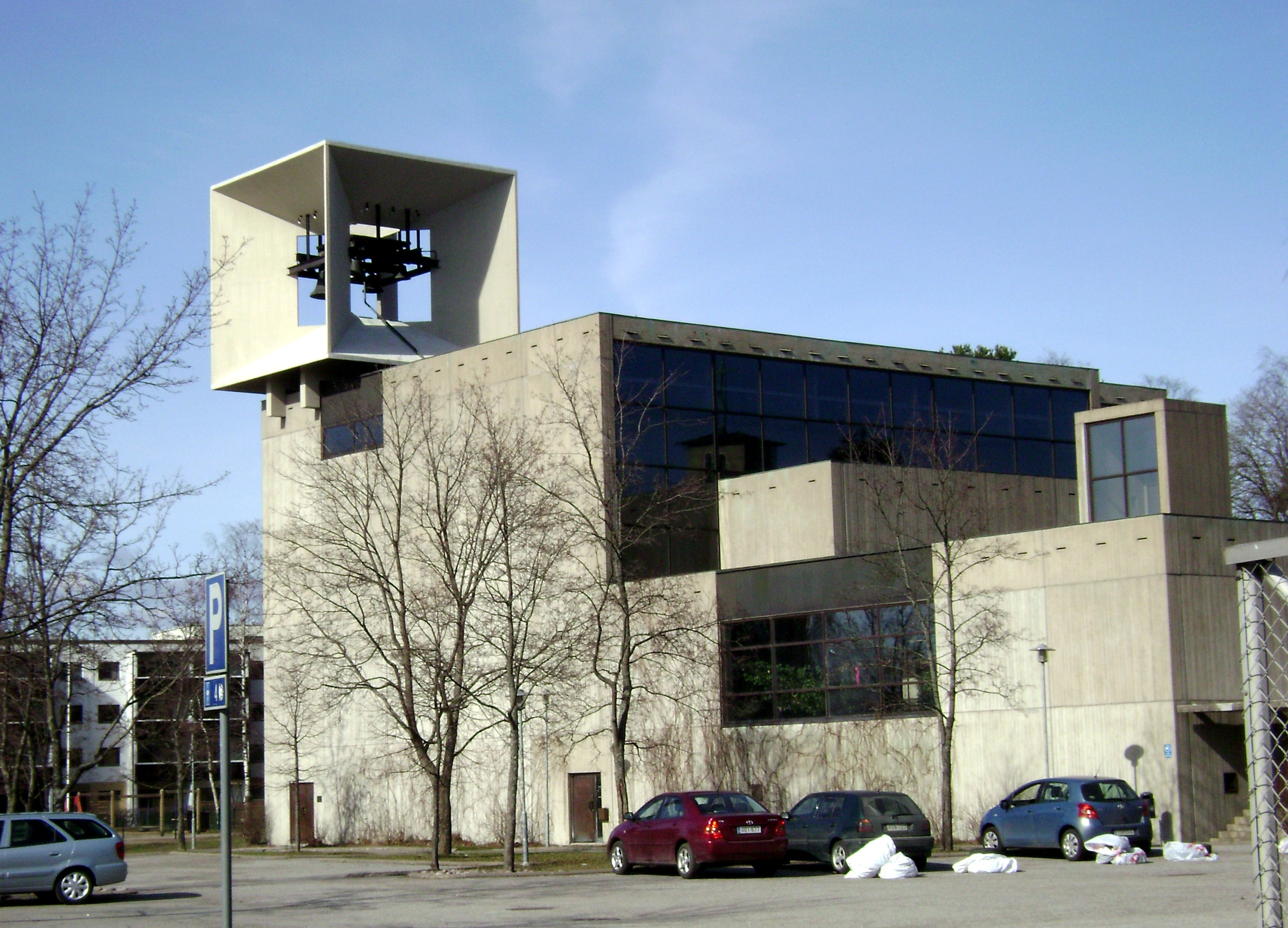
Järvenpää Church (1968), Erkki Elomaa.

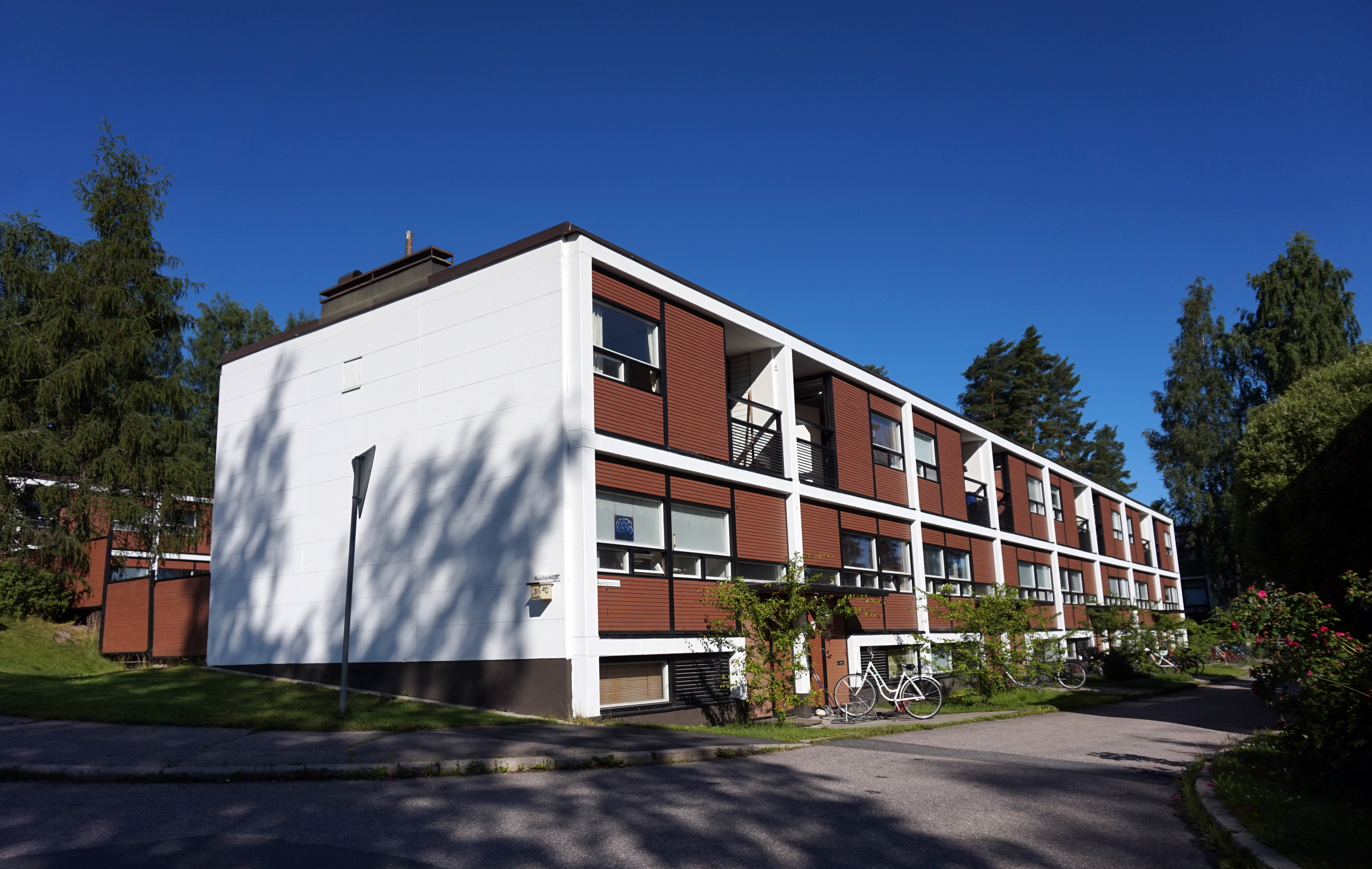
Kortepohja prefabricated housing (1964–1969), Bengt Lundsten and Esko Kahri.

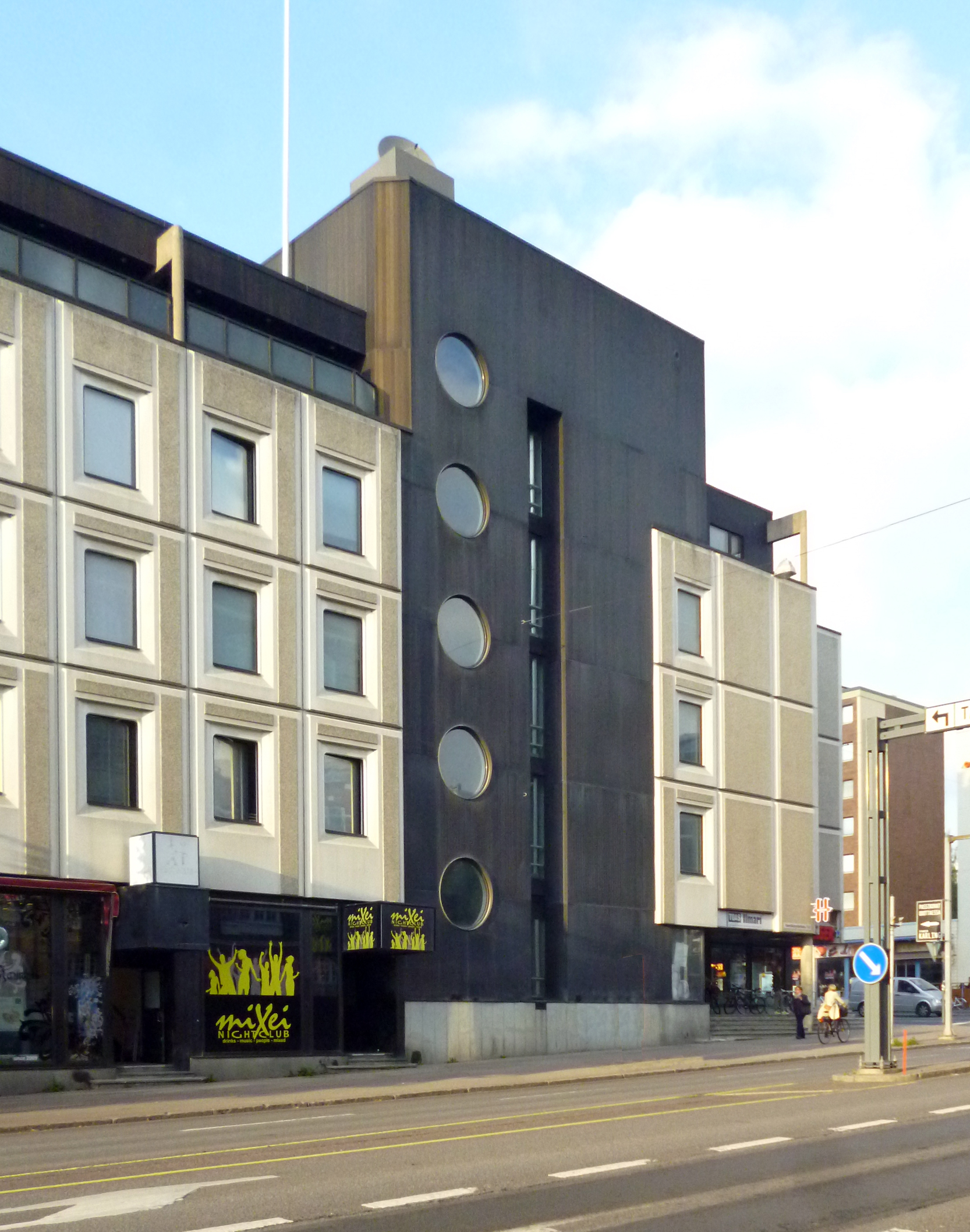
STS Bank, Tampere (1973), Kosti Kuronen.

Aulis Blomstedt was the key figure here, as one of the founding figures of the Museum of Finnish Architecture, professor of architecture theory at Helsinki University of Technology, editor of the main Finnish architecture journal Arkkitehti (Finnish Architecture Review), and as a key founding member in 1953 of PTAH (Progrès Téchnique Architecture Helsinki), that is, the Helsinki/Finnish branch of CIAM, he went on to co-found in 1958 Le Carré Bleu, a journal of architecture theory published originally solely in French (so that it would come to the attention of the key players in CIAM). Already in the PTAH manifesto of 1954, called "Thesis about form", which was sent to the CIAM council in Paris, Blomstedt, as its main author, declared that form and beauty are manifested in proportions and that the doctrine of proportion links mathematics and architecture to a natural whole. Accordingly, the focus of the journal Le Carré Bleu was on a strict formalism and morphology. Among its articles, the journal featured Blomstedt's own studies in geometric proportion and dimensioning systems, inspired just as much by harmonic systems devised by Swiss mathematician Hans Kayser as Le Corbusier's studies of proportional systems. One of Blomstedt's key works, the extension to the Finnish Language Adult Education Centre, Helsinki (1959) (the main building, from 1927, had been designed by Gunnar Taucher together with Blomstedt's older brother Pauli E. Blomstedt) was an application of this research, with the entire building based on subdivisions of a basic 360 mm module (5×72, 3×120 and 2×180 mm). Indeed, the crux of Blomstedt's approach was the development of a dimensioning and proportional system for architectural design that, he argued, was in harmony with the laws of nature and beauty (human scale and musical harmony) while also providing a standard system for the mass industrialisation of building, which was regarded as central to the efficacy of modernism. One of Blomstedt's proportional experiments, from 1973, even became the logo for the Museum of Finnish Architecture.

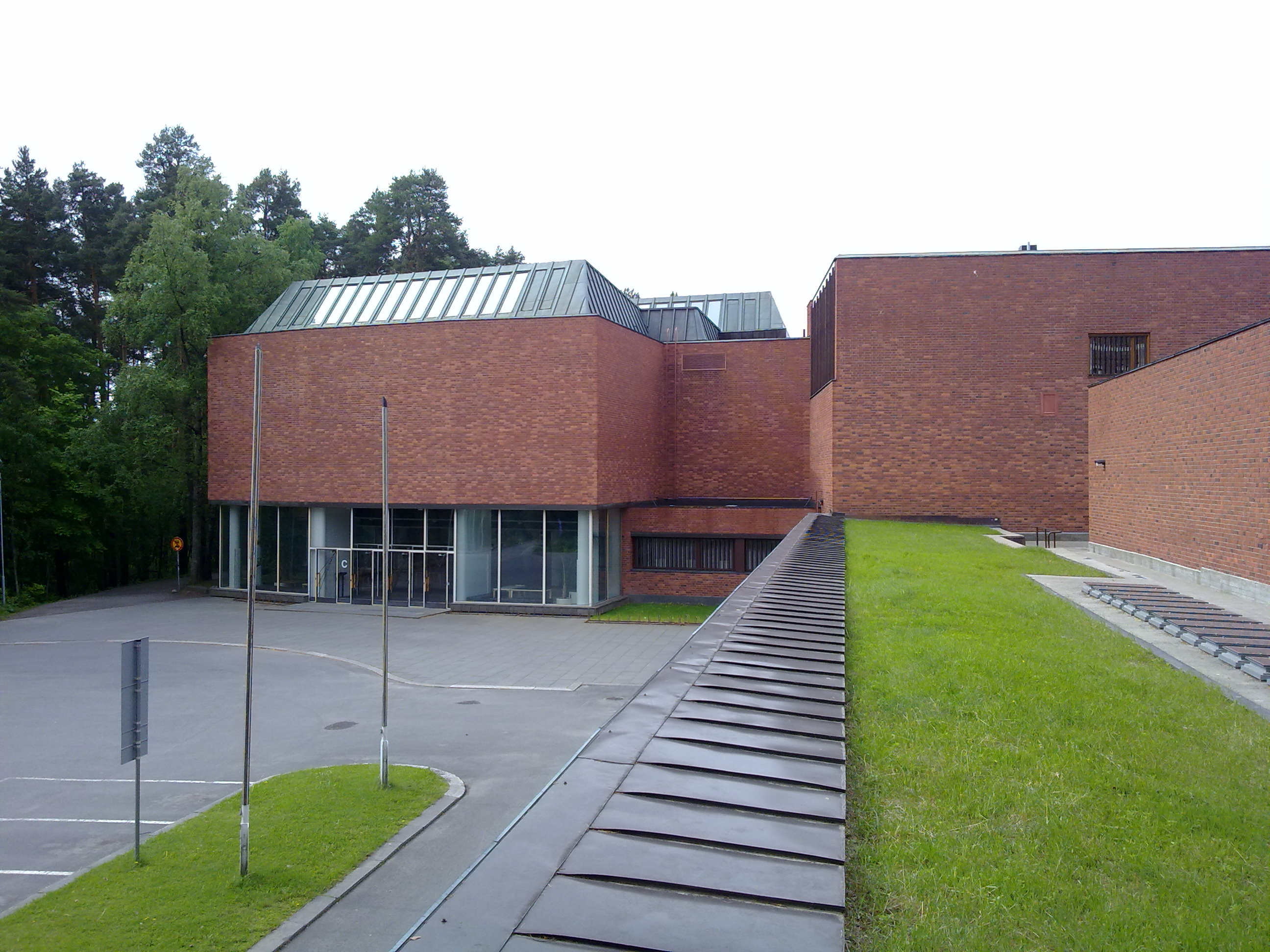
Alvar Aalto, Jyväskylä University, Seminaarinmäki campus, 1951–1969

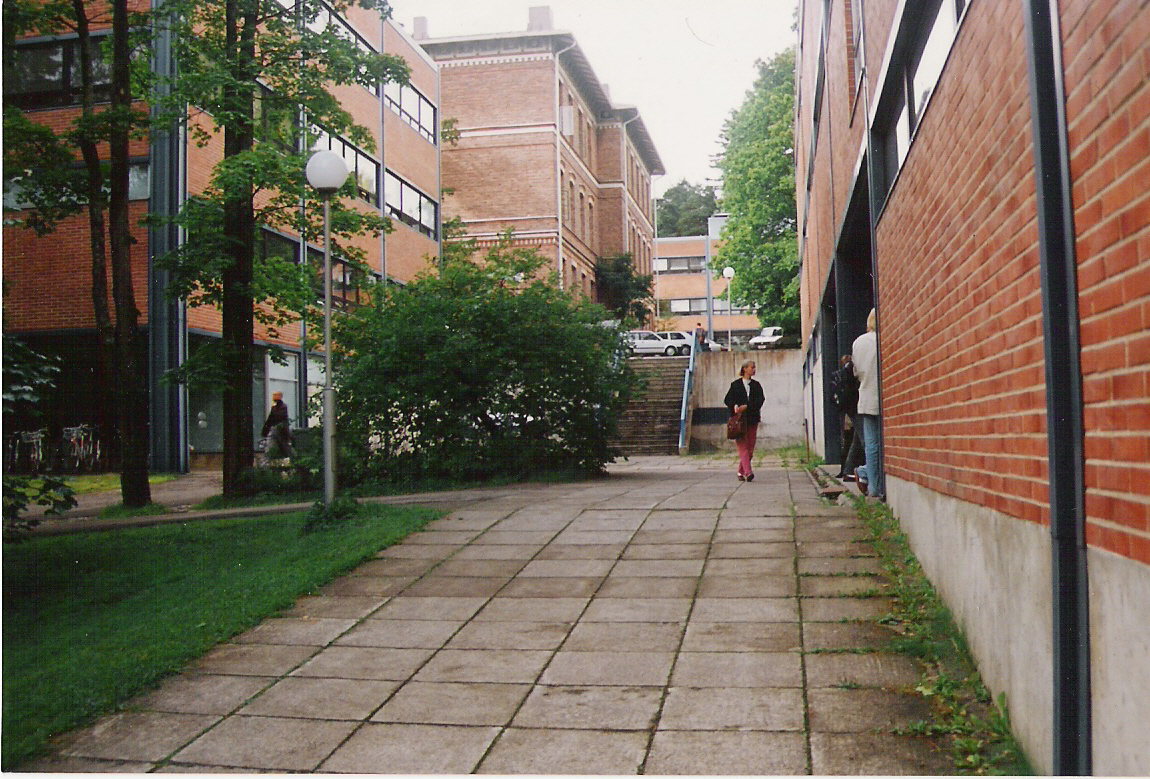
Arto Sipinen, Jyväskylä University, Seminaarinmäki campus, 1970–

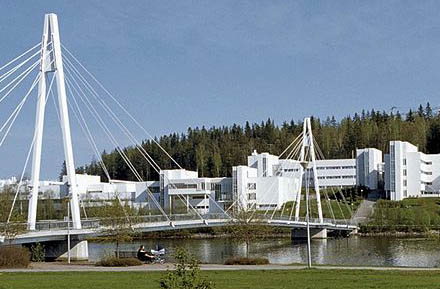
Arto Sipinen, Jyväskylä University, Ylistönrinne campus, 1990s

Architectural development of the University of Jyväskylä campuses.

Reima Pietilä had also been active in the activities of the Museum of Finnish Architecture as well as publishing theoretical articles in Le Carré Bleu and Arkkitehti. Pietilä even attended a meeting of the Team X group of architects, held in 1972 at Cornell University in the US, who were very much concerned with questions of structuralism in architecture, that is emphasising the elements of culture, somewhat in reaction to the universalising tendencies of modernism, especially as originally promoted by Team X's instigators, the older generation of CIAM. Pietilä took a diametric viewpoint to that of the rationalist school, and though the works (designed in partnership with his wife Raili Pietilä) had much of the organic idiosyncrasies of Aalto, they were far more abstract and nebulous. In arguing that nature is the apotheosis of plasticity, he demanded a morphological analysis of architectural products, considering Euclidean geometry as an inadequate instrument of analysis. His first major work, the Finnish Pavilion at the 1958 Brussels Expo did in fact take a modular approach akin to the theories of Blomstedt; however, the wooden rectangular box-like units as a whole gave a foretaste of Pietilä's later surfaces based entirely on free form; the most notable of these organic works being Kaleva Church, Tampere (1959–1966), Dipoli student assembly building, Espoo (1961–66), Metso Library, Tampere (1978–1986) and culminating in his final work, the Official Residence of the President of Finland, Mäntyniemi, Helsinki (1983–1993). All these buildings had been the result of open architectural competitions.

A more direct connection between Aalto and the somewhat opposing trend of Structuralism can be seen in the work of Arto Sipinen; he had been an employee of Aalto at the time when the latter was directing the construction of the Seminaarinmäki campus for the University of Jyväskylä (1951–1969). Aalto had resigned from planning of the area in 1969 following disagreements with the clients and consequently a competition was held in 1969–70 for the further planning of the campus, including a new main library. The competition was won by Sipinen. But in contrast to Aalto's vaguely organic or, as he himself termed, an "Athenian acropolis layout" (i.e., individual non-rectangular-shaped buildings set within a park landscape and with long vistas into the distance), Sipinen's scheme involved a Structuralist-inspired layout, part strict rational grid, with distinct rectangular-shaped buildings, and part urban "Kasbah", as he himself termed it, with alleyways and courtyards, albeit continuing the use of redbrick which Aalto had also followed from the existing buildings on the site dating from the 19th century. During the following decades, Sipinen would continue the same Structuralist form language in the design of the Espoo Cultural Centre (1989), as well as in the University of Jyväskylä's other campuses at Mattilanniemi and Ylistönrinne, though building the entire new campuses in "white".

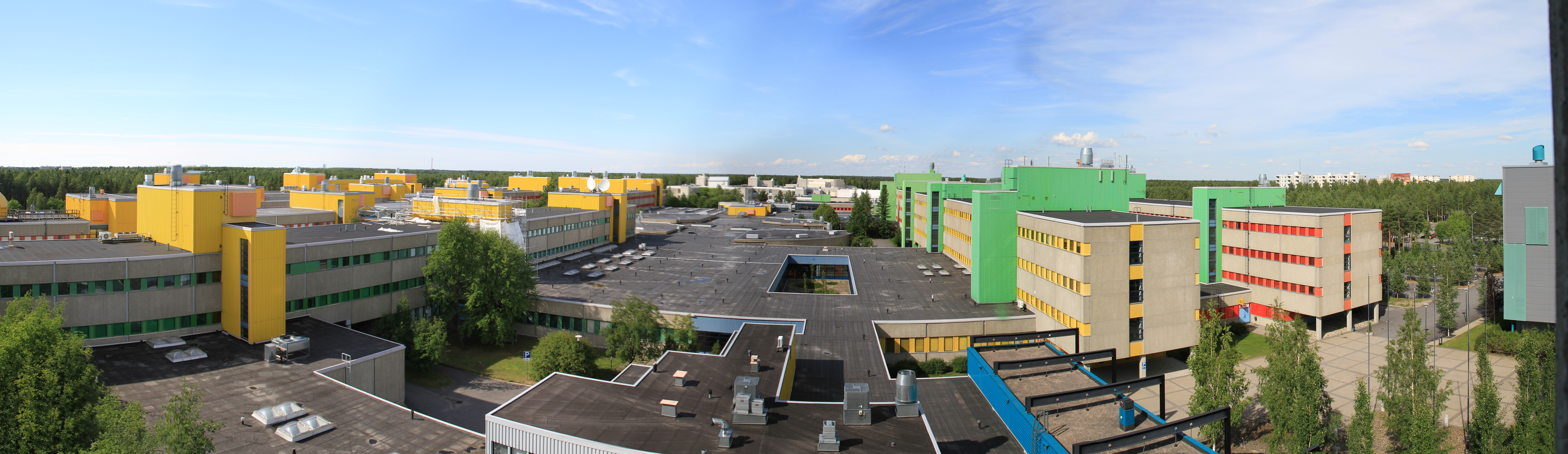
University of Oulu campus, Kari Virta (1967).

Both Aalto's and Sipinen's work on the planning of the University of Jyväskylä campus, and so too Aalto's planning of the Helsinki University of Technology campus in Otaniemi, should also be seen within the context of the Finnish state's desire after the war to expand further education throughout the country, with the foundation of several new universities with purpose-built campuses. Another former Aalto employee, Jaakko Kontio (together with Kalle Räike), designed the campus of the Lappeenranta University of Technology (1969), partly following the red-brick aesthetic of Aalto as well as the then topical Structuralist-inspired layouts. These Structuralist-inspired layout of Sipinen's or Kontio's works had a more gritty counterpart – in the sense of spurning expensive materials associated with tradition and grandeur – in the University of Oulu campus (1967) designed by Kari Virta; working on the idea of an infinitely extendable "mat building", with the individual parts made from brightly painted prefabricated elements made from cheap materials.

If the minimalism of the "rationalist school" could be equally inspired by the works of the modernist masters Le Corbusier and Ludwig Mies van der Rohe as the machine aesthetic of Russian Constructivist architecture or the machine futurism of Buckminster Fuller, there were also allusions and references to cultural precedent, equally Finnish peasant dwellings and Japanese vernacular architecture. This attitude could also indeed be seen as falling under the Structuralist outlook of that time, as evident also in Japanese modernist architects such as Kenzo Tange, and in the parallel architectural phenomenon of Brutalist architecture (a reference to the British architectural style from the same period). The main exponent of this style was Aarno Ruusuvuori, with the heavy use of concrete as an aesthetic; e.g., Huutoniemi Church, Vaasa (1964), Tapiola Church (1965) and the Weilin & Göös Print Works, Espoo (1964–1966; converted into the WeeGee Exhibition Centre, 2006). Other well known examples of the Brutalist concrete style were Holy Cross Chapel, Turku, by Pekka Pitkänen (1967), Järvenpää Church by Erkki Elomaa (1968) and the Sibelius Museum, Turku, by Woldemar Baeckman (1968). The prevailing construction method of prefabricated concrete elements during the 1960s and 1970s was given a different interpretation in the STS Bank building (1973–1976), Tampere, by Kosti Kuronen, where it took on a form language of "building blocks" and "porthole windows" inspired by Japanese Metabolist architecture, suggesting growth and adaptability.

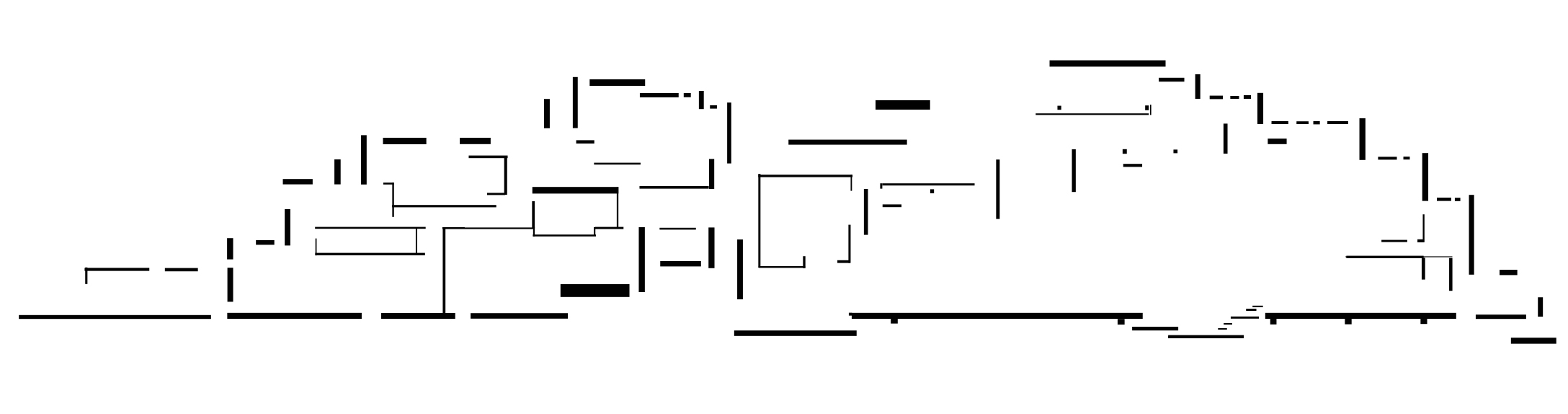
Solid wall composition in the floor plan

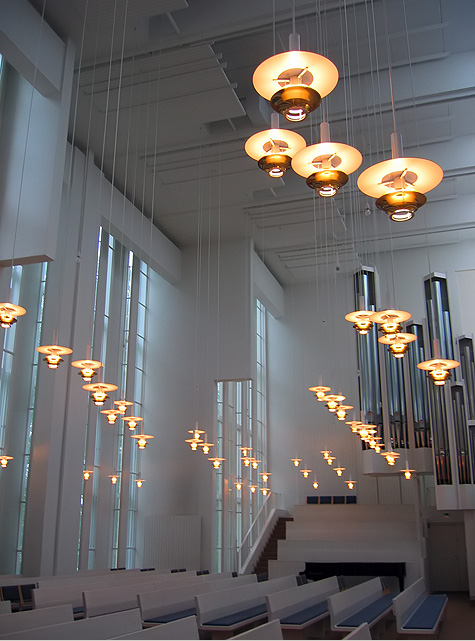
Main church space

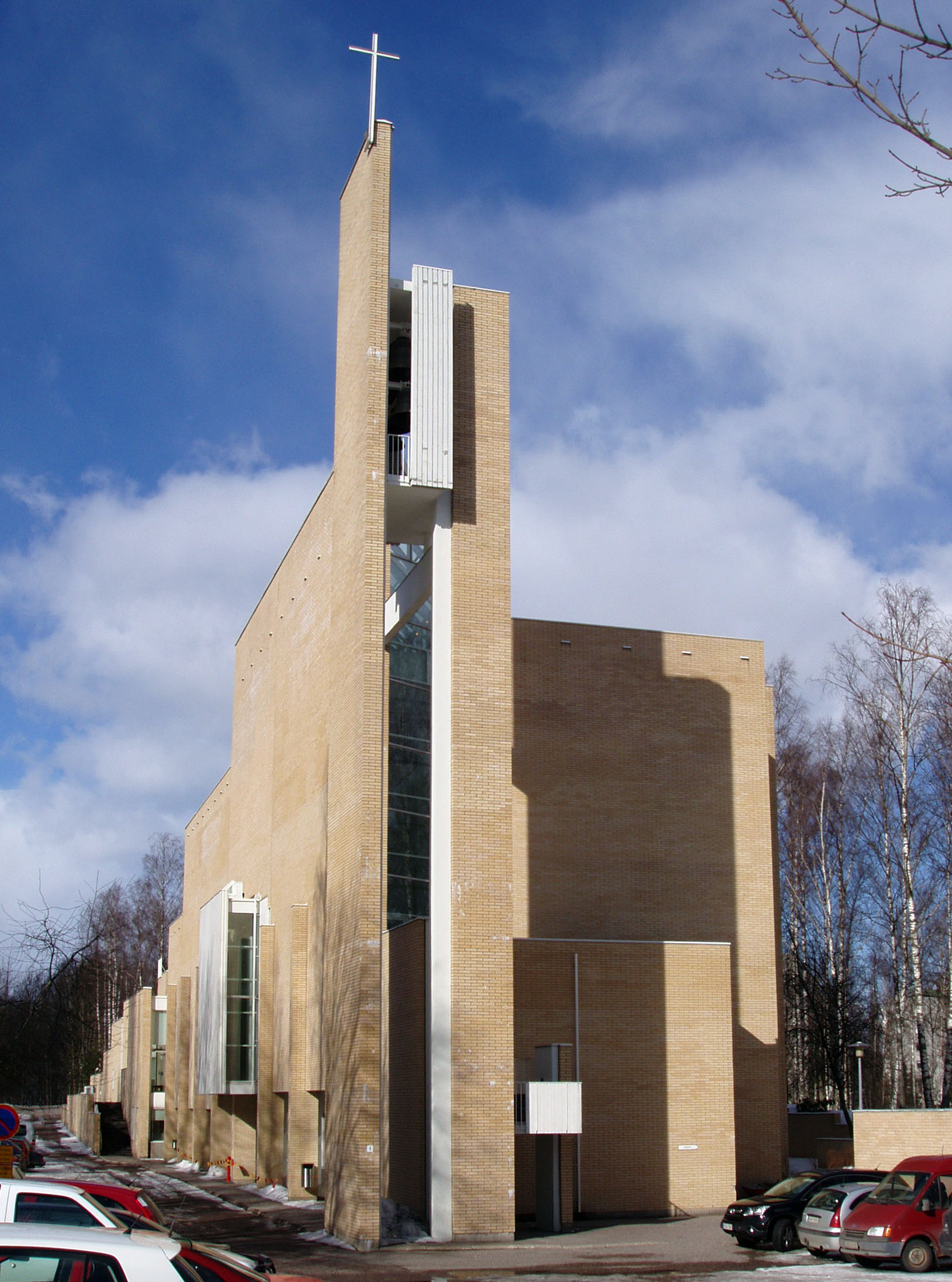
Exterior

Juha Leiviskä, Myyrmäki Church (1984); "unbounded space".

The ideas of Mies van der Rohe have had a different interpretation in the buildings of Juha Leiviskä, equally inspired by De Stijl in regard to the unbounded continuity of space as represented by series of parallel walls, but also ideas about the ethereal qualities of natural light from German Baroque churches (e.g., the churches designed by the Asam brothers) as well as lamps in Turkish churches and mosques, including Hagia Sophia; indeed, Leiviskä made his reputation with competition success in the design of churches; e.g., St.Thomas's Church and Parish Centre, Oulu (1975), Myyrmäki Church, Vantaa (1984), Kirkkonummi Parish Centre, Kirkkonummi (1984), Männistö Church, Kuopio (1992), and Pakila Church, Helsinki (2002). Thus, for instance, in the case of the Myyrmäki church, it is evident already on the exterior that the interior space of the relatively long building is generally comprised from the spaces left between a series of "free-standing" solid walls; that is, there are no rectangular-shaped spaces.

=== Postmodernism, Critical Regionalism, Deconstruction, Minimalism, Parametricism ===
Since the late 1970s Finland has been more open to direct international influences. The continuity from the earlier Functionalism, however, has been evident in a prevailing Minimalism, seen, for example, in the works of Heikkinen – Komonen Architects (e.g., Heureka Science Centre, Vantaa, 1985–1989) and Olli Pekka Jokela (e.g., Biokeskus 3, Helsinki, 2001) as well as the prolific output of Pekka Helin (e.g., Finnish Parliament Annex, 2004). The irony and playfulness of Postmodern architecture was greeted with disdain in Finland, though it would be incorrect to say it had no influence, especially so if one sees it as part of the dominant "spirit of the times". For example, the works of Simo Paavilainen (influenced more by his scholarly interest in Nordic Classicism and Postmodernism's Italian rationalist interpretation), the more whimsical postmodern collages of Nurmela-Raimoranta-Tasa architects (e.g., BePOP shopping centre, Pori, 1989), and the theoretical musings on place and phenomenology by Juhani Pallasmaa. Aalto's architecture (the early Nordic Classicism and later mature works) was used in defending the positions of both modernist and postmodernist schools of thought. The architects of the so-called "Oulu koulu" (Oulu school), including Heikki Taskinen and Reijo Niskasaari, had been students of Reima Pietilä at the University of Oulu school of architecture, and in attempting to create a regionalist architecture, combined elements of populist postmodernism – for instance, the quotation of classical elements such as pediments – with ideas about vernacular architecture, organic growth and building morphology. A key example of this was Oulunsalo town hall (1982) by Arkkitehtitoimisto NVV (architects Kari Niskasaari, Reijo Niskasaari, Kaarlo Viljanen, Ilpo Väisänen and Jorma Öhman).

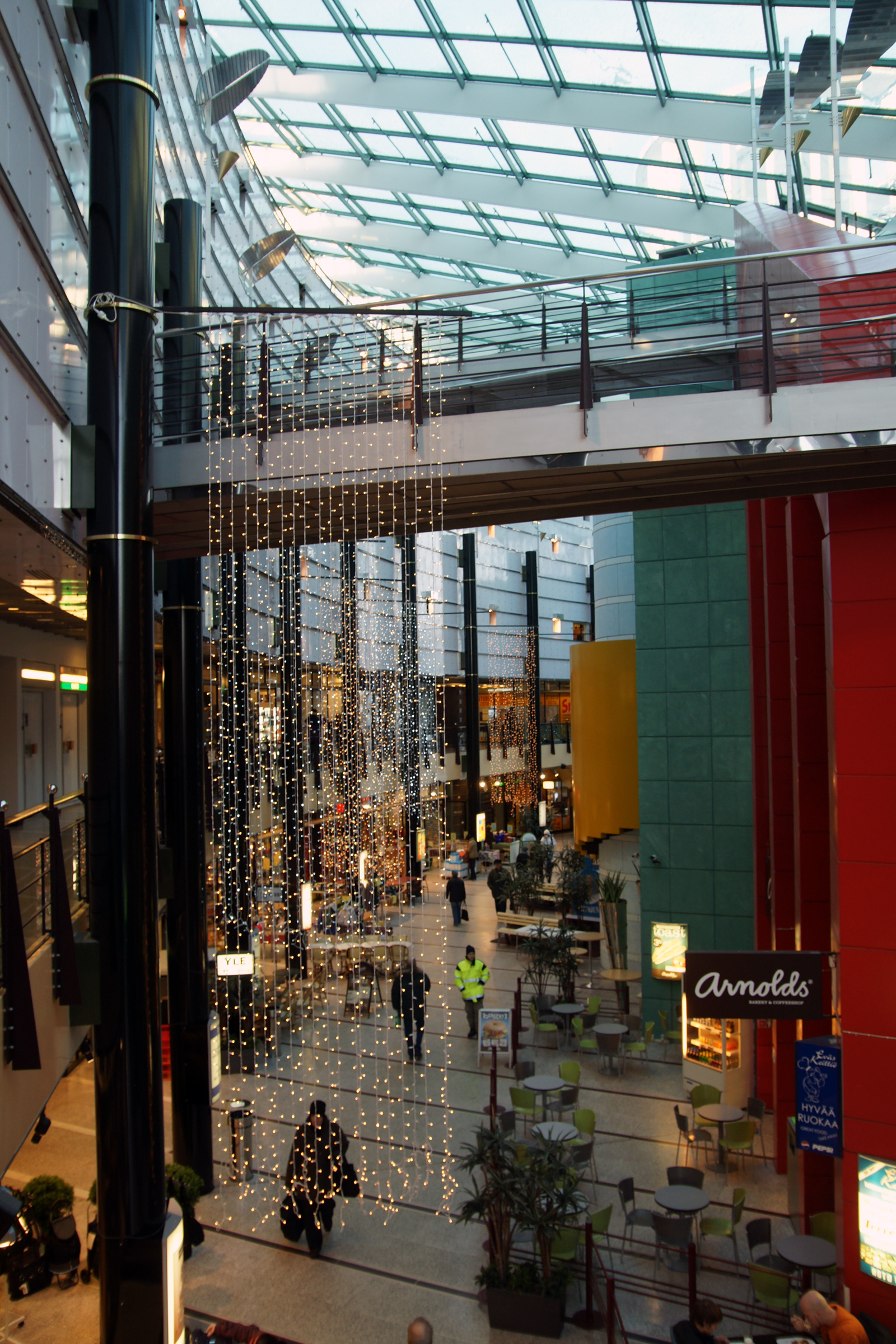
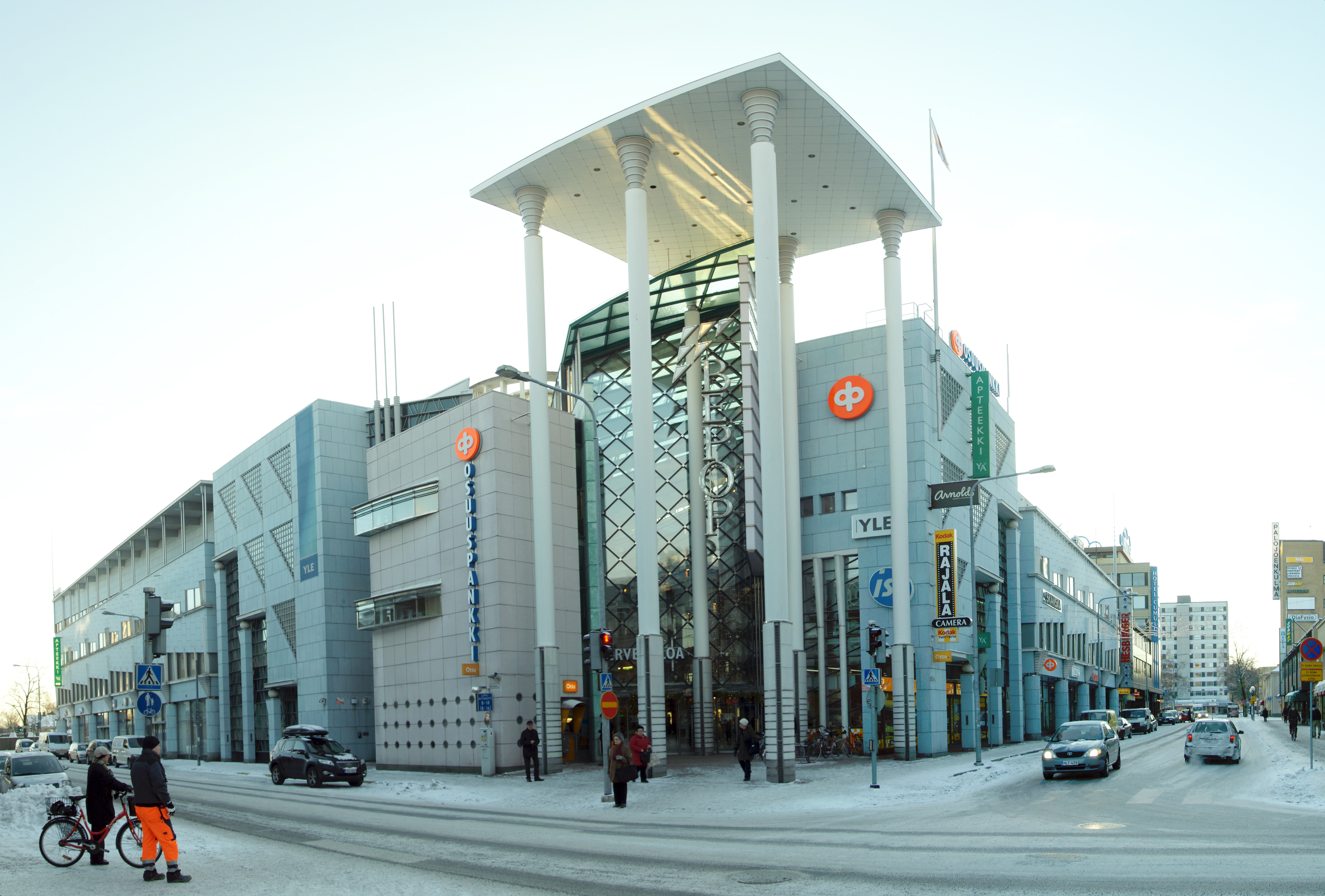
BePOP shopping centre, Pori (1989), Nurmela-Raimoranta-Tasa architects

However, the greatest influence from postmodernism in Finland came through urban planning. This was part of an originally southern and central European trend from the late 1970s onwards that reassessed the European city which had been decimated by war but also modernist planning principles. Key architect-theorists in this viewpoint were, the rationalist architects from Italy Aldo Rossi and Giorgio Grassi, the Swiss architect Mario Botta, and the German architect Oswald Mathias Ungers, and the more historicist-minded Luxembourg postmodernists Rob Krier and Leon Krier. All of these in different ways were concerned in reviving the idea of typology, that is, precedents in urban form. One of the key "forums" for this "reconstruction of the European city" was the International Building Exhibition Berlin (IBA), built in the then West Berlin from 1979 to 1985, and where the above architects had a profound influence. No Finnish architects were present in IBA, yet in Finnish cities this renewed urban attitude became evident in planning practices to the extent that urban planning under the control of the city planning authorities could set very precise demands on urban development; for example, the layouts of traditional street grids, and even the overall appearance of buildings in terms of height, streetscape, roof line, and building materials. Key examples are the planning of the areas of Itä-Pasila (western edge) and Länsi-Pasila and Katajanokka in Helsinki. In terms of architectural form, this often materialised as postmodernist details added to an overall mass. For example, in the Otavamedia (publishers) offices in Länsi-Pasila, Helsinki (1986) by Ilmo Valjakka, postmodern versions of central and southern European details such as corner towers, blind (i.e. unusable) colonnades and scenographic bridges, are added to the overall mass. Also, in the BePOP shopping centre (1989), Pori, by Nurmela-Raimoranta-Tasa architects, for all its idiosyncratic postmodern interior and curved "medieval" street cutting through the building, the overall urban block still fits within strict height parameters for the area. The Kankaanpää public office centre (1994) by architects Sinikka Kouvo and Erkki Partanen applied a "heterotopic" ordering – clashes of different volumes – previously discernible in the mature work of Aalto but with a postmodernist twist of Mario Botta-esque "round houses" and striking striped bands of brickwork.

The aims at a new understanding of regionalism yet in a modern idiom materialised in the greater use of timber – the building material most associated historically with Finnish architecture. However, there lies a dichotomy in its use: between its inherent positive values and its use as symbolising nostalgia, not to mention exploiting its industrial potential by the pervading timber industry. Already in 1956 Alvar Aalto argued that the use of wood was not a nostalgic return to a traditional material; it was a case of its "biological characteristics, its limited heat conductivity, its kinship with man and living nature, the pleasant sensation to the touch that it gives.". A special unit, the so-called Wood Studio – partly funded by the Finnish wood industry – was founded at Aalto University not only to research wood construction but also to build experimental structures in wood, often using computer-based parametric design principles. An early example of this is the Observation Tower at Helsinki Zoo (2002) by Ville Hara and the Wood Studio. Similarly, Kärsämäki Shingle Church (1999–2004) by Anssi Lassila, was the result of a student competition held by the University of Oulu Department of Architecture, based on the idea of a modern church built using 18th century timber construction techniques, as a reminder of a previous church on the same site. Other notable large-scale wooden constructions since 2000 include the Sibelius Concert Hall, Lahti (1997–2000), by APRT; the east stand roof of the Helsinki Olympic Stadium (2005) by K2S Architects; and Kilden Performing Arts Centre, Kristiansand, Norway (2012) and Helsinki Main Library Oodi (2018) both by ALA Architects. The Museum of the History of Polish Jews, Warsaw, Poland (2013), by Lahdelma & Mahlamäki is characterised by the principle of "complex objects in a glass box", including parametrically designed organic forms.

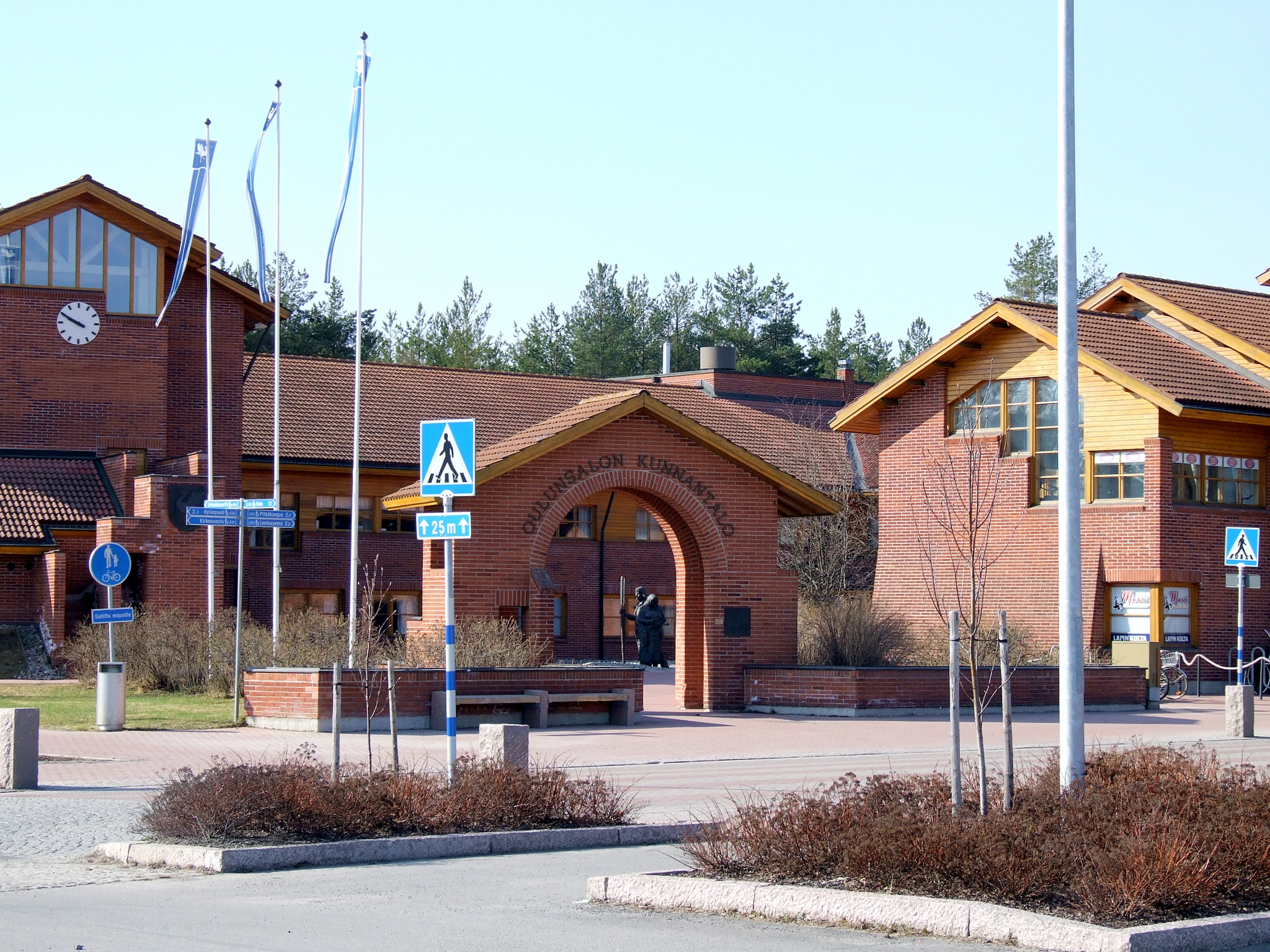
Oulunsalo Town Hall (1982) Arkkitehtitoimisto NVV.

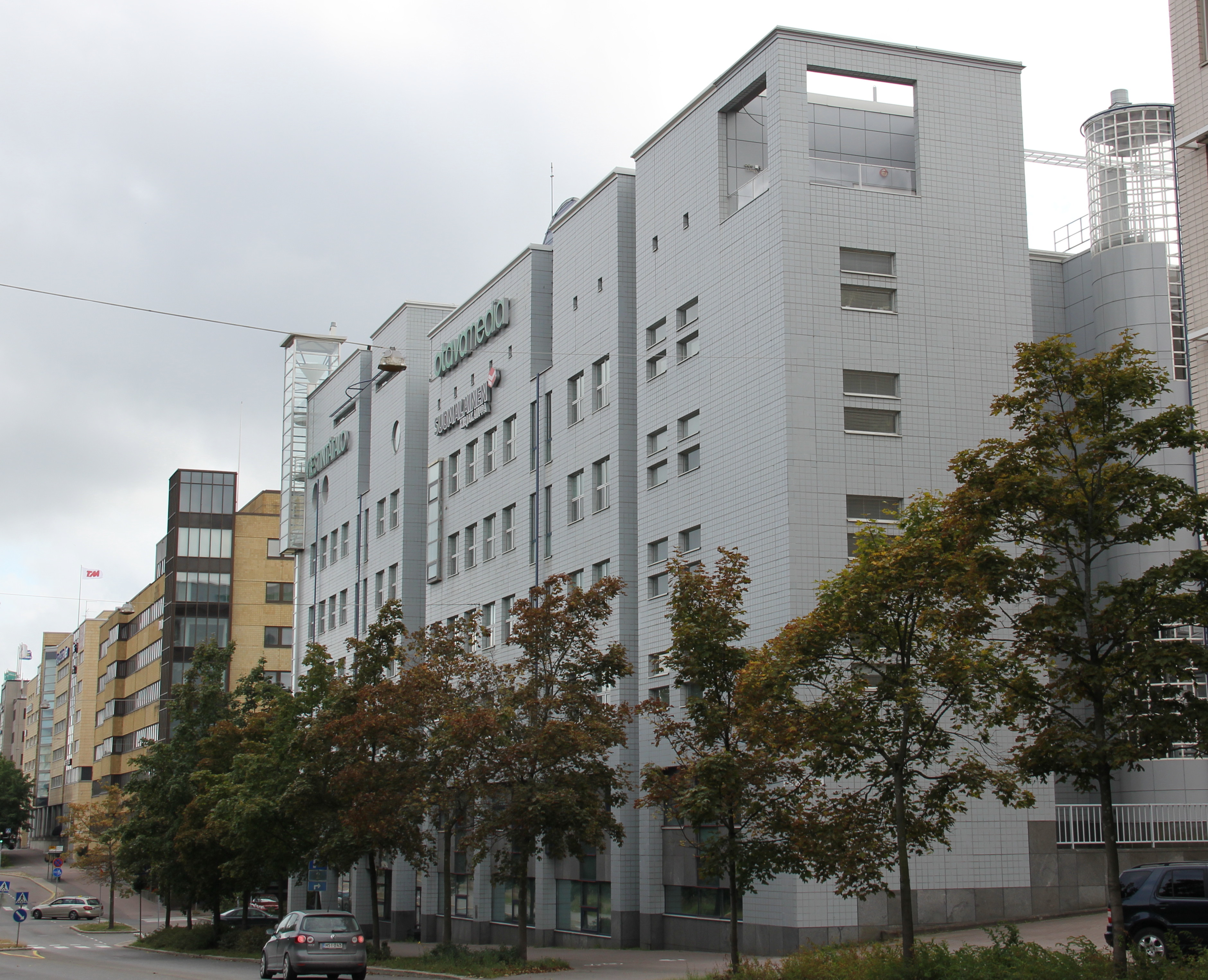
Otavamedia (publishers) offices, Länsi-Pasila, Helsinki (1986), Ilmo Valjakka.

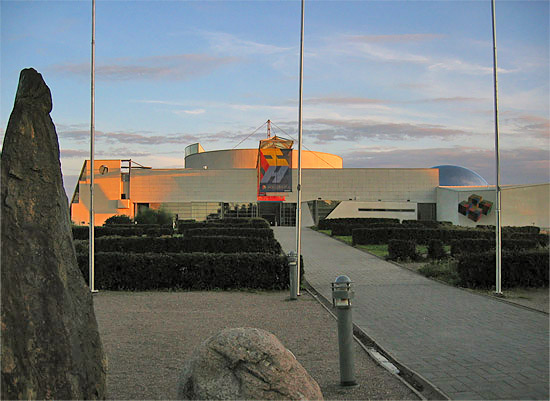
Heureka Science Centre (1985–1989), Heikkinen-Kommonen Architects.

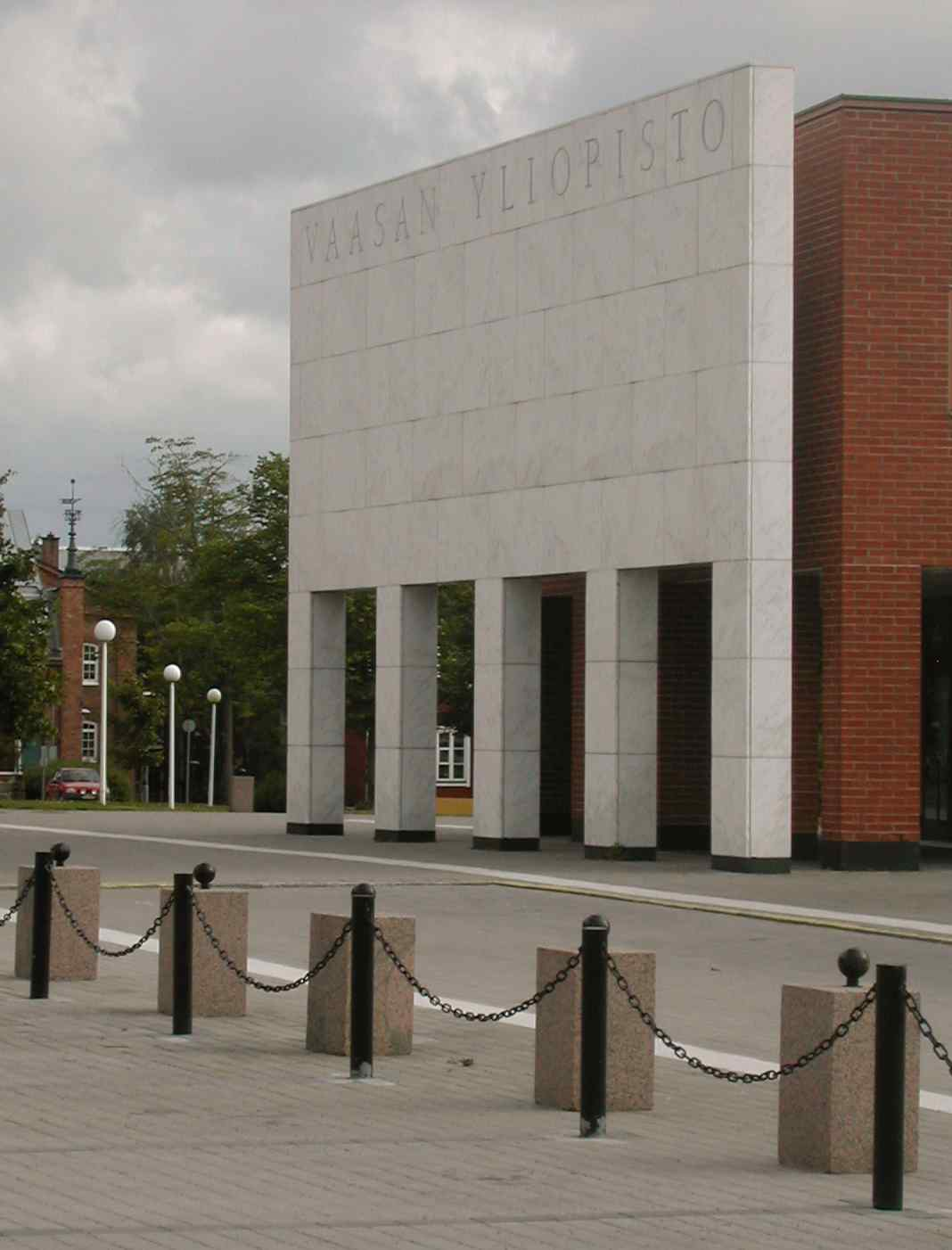
University of Vaasa (1994), Simo and Käpy Paavilainen.

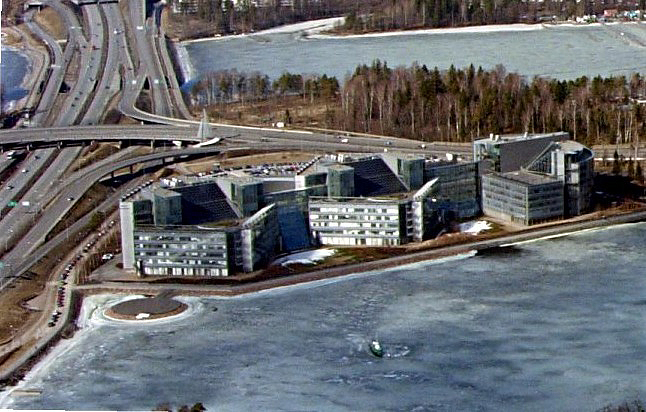
Nokia HQ, Espoo (1983–1997), Helin and Siitonen Architects.

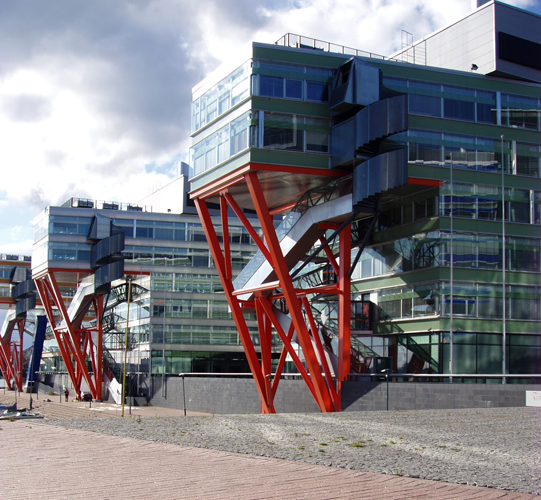
Seafront regeneration: High Tech Centre, Ruoholahti, Helsinki (2001), Kai Wartiainen.

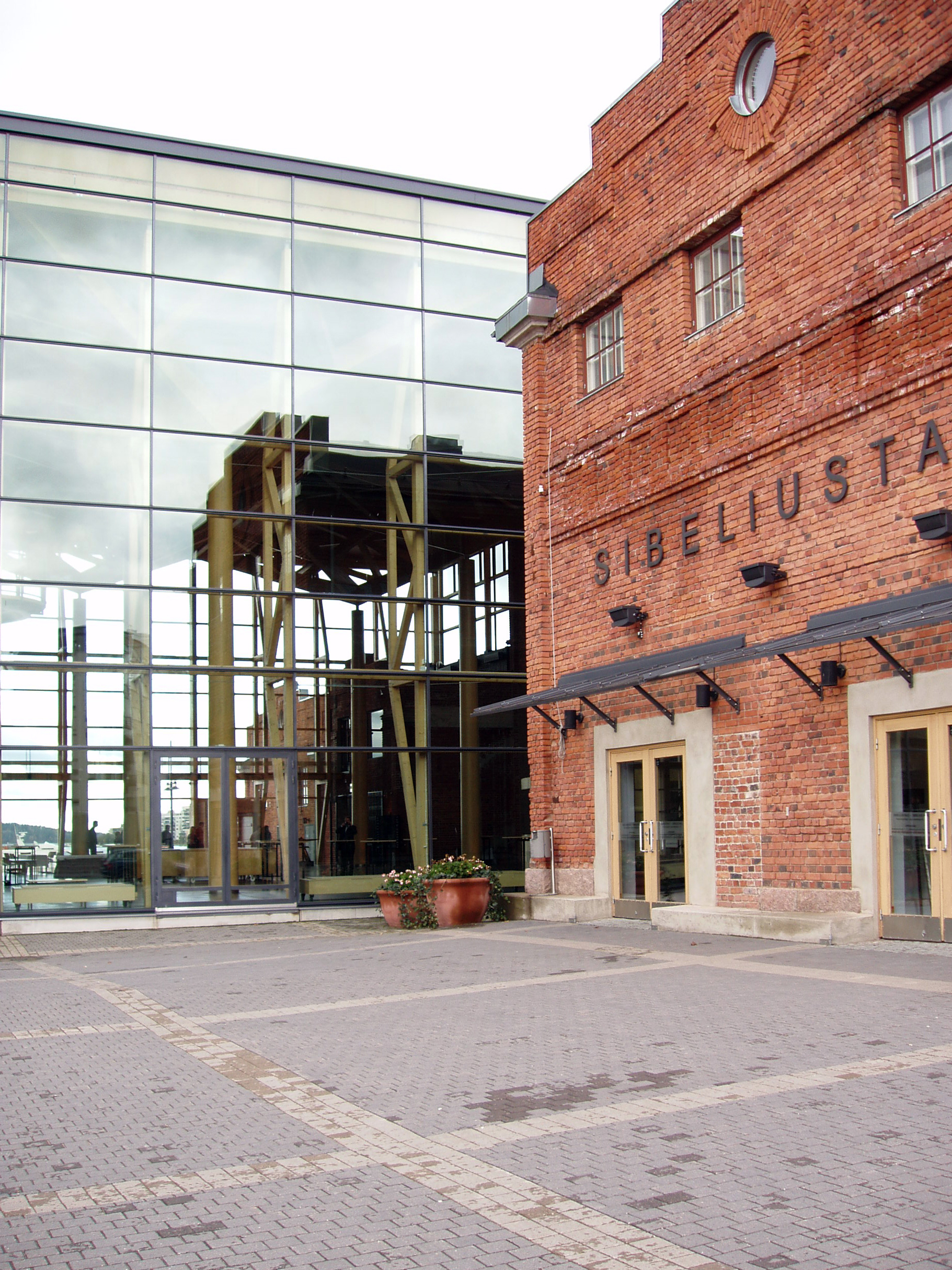
Sibelius Hall, Lahti (2000), Hannu Tikka and Kimmo Lintula (APRT Architects).

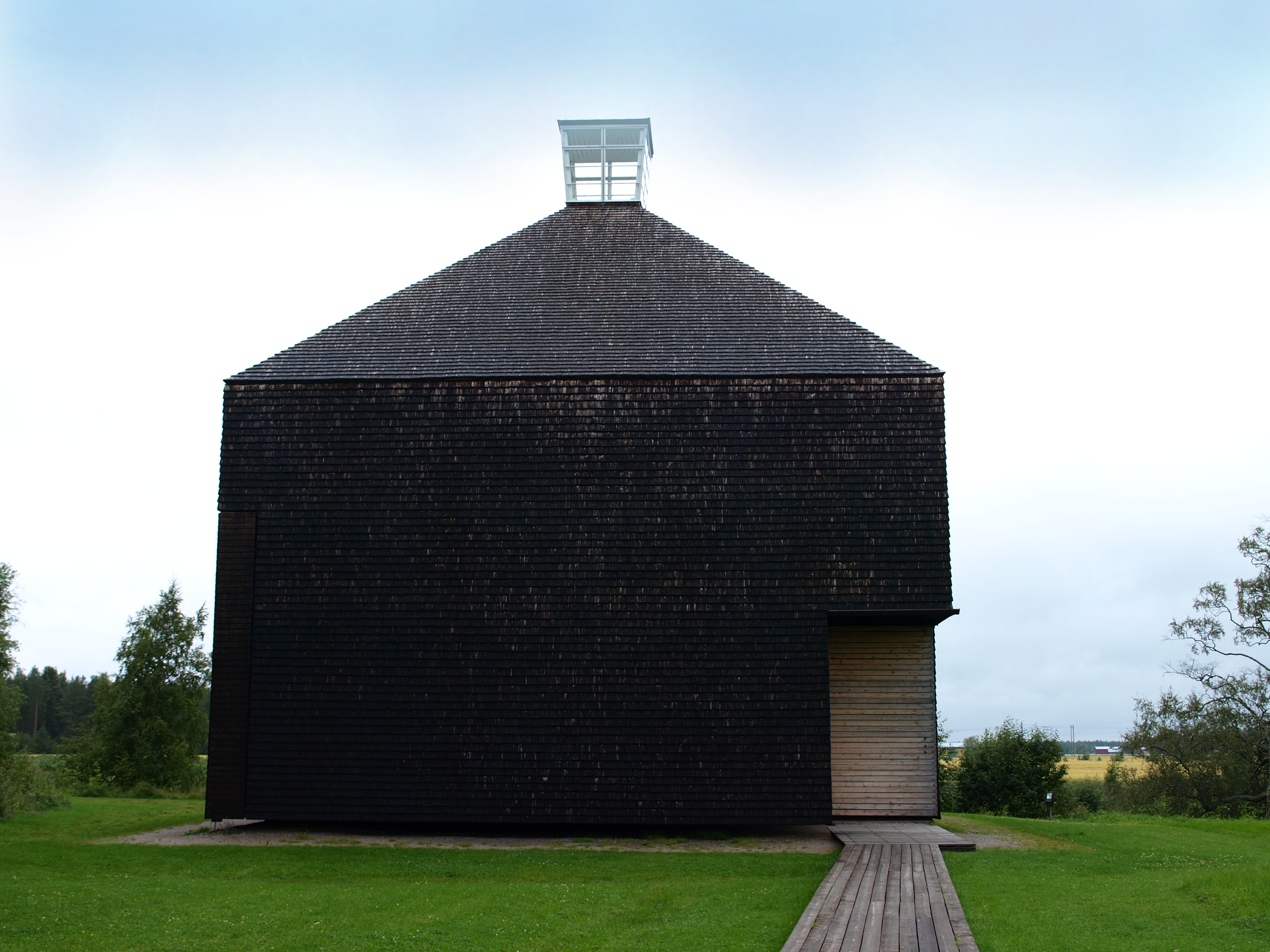
Kärsämäki Shingle Church (1999–2004), Anssi Lassila.

Kilden Performing Arts Centre, Kristiansand, Norway (2012), ALA Architects.

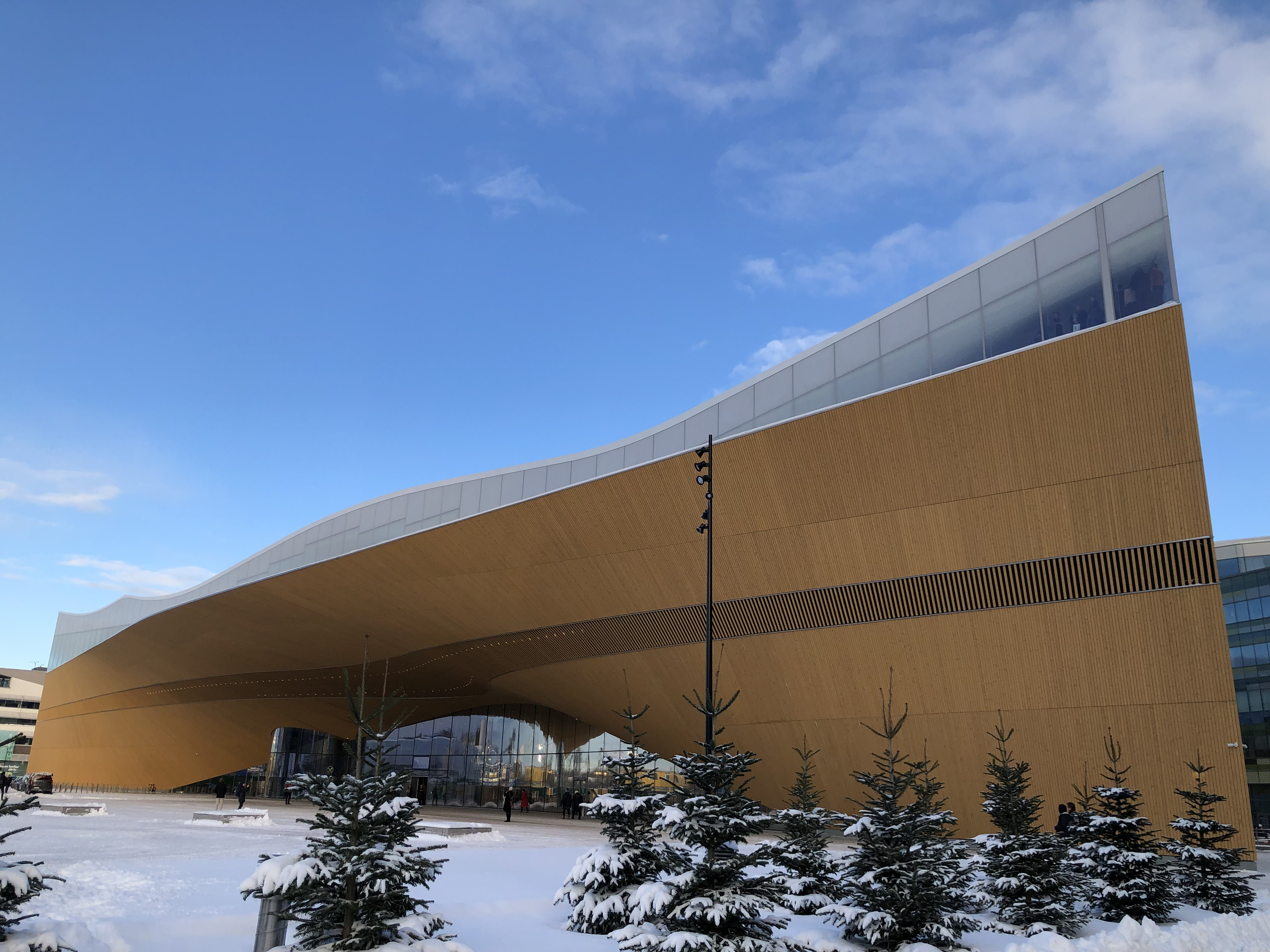
Helsinki Central Library Oodi, Helsinki (2018), ALA Architects

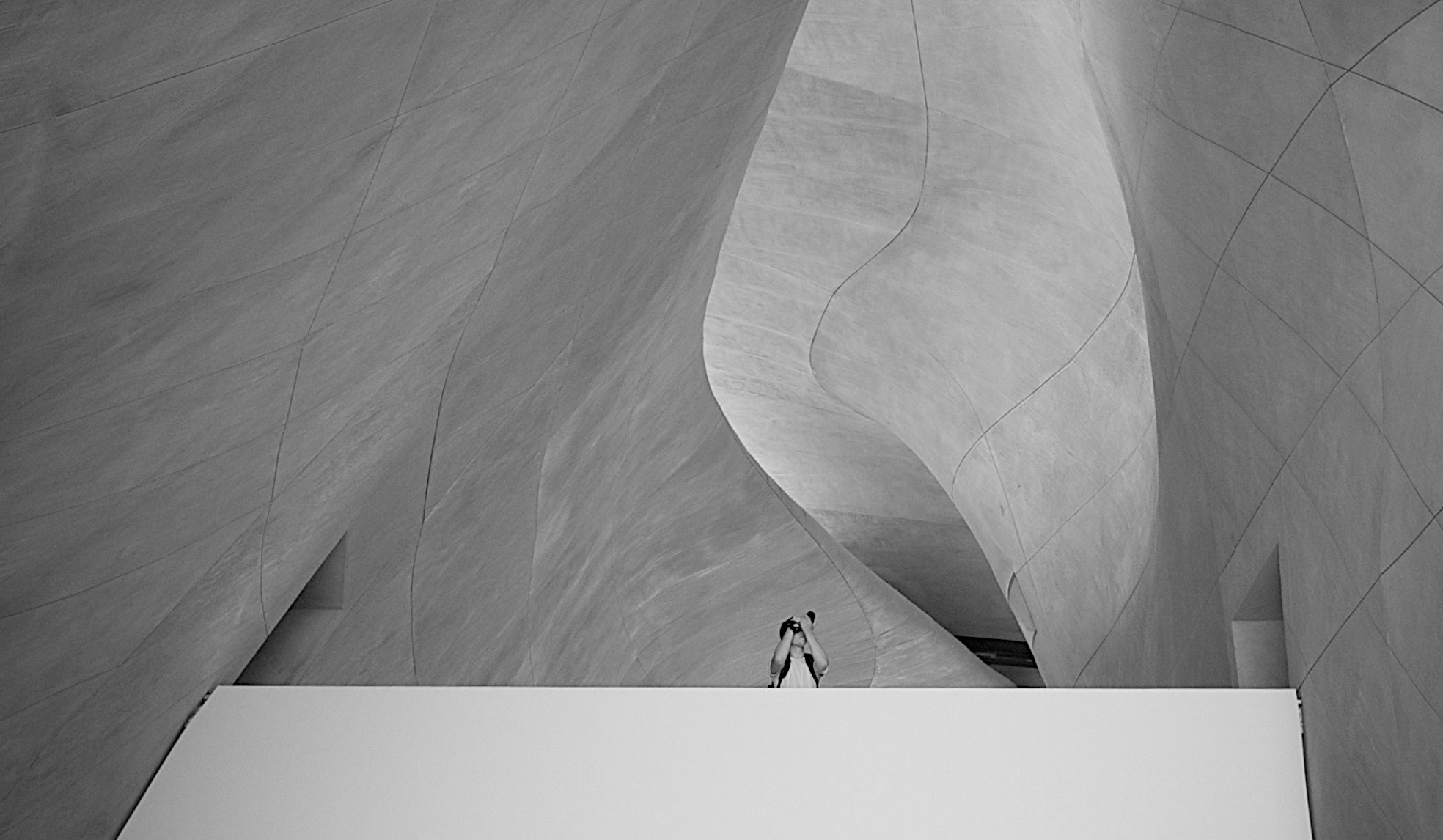
Museum of the History of Polish Jews, Warsaw (2013), Lahdelma & Mahlamäki.

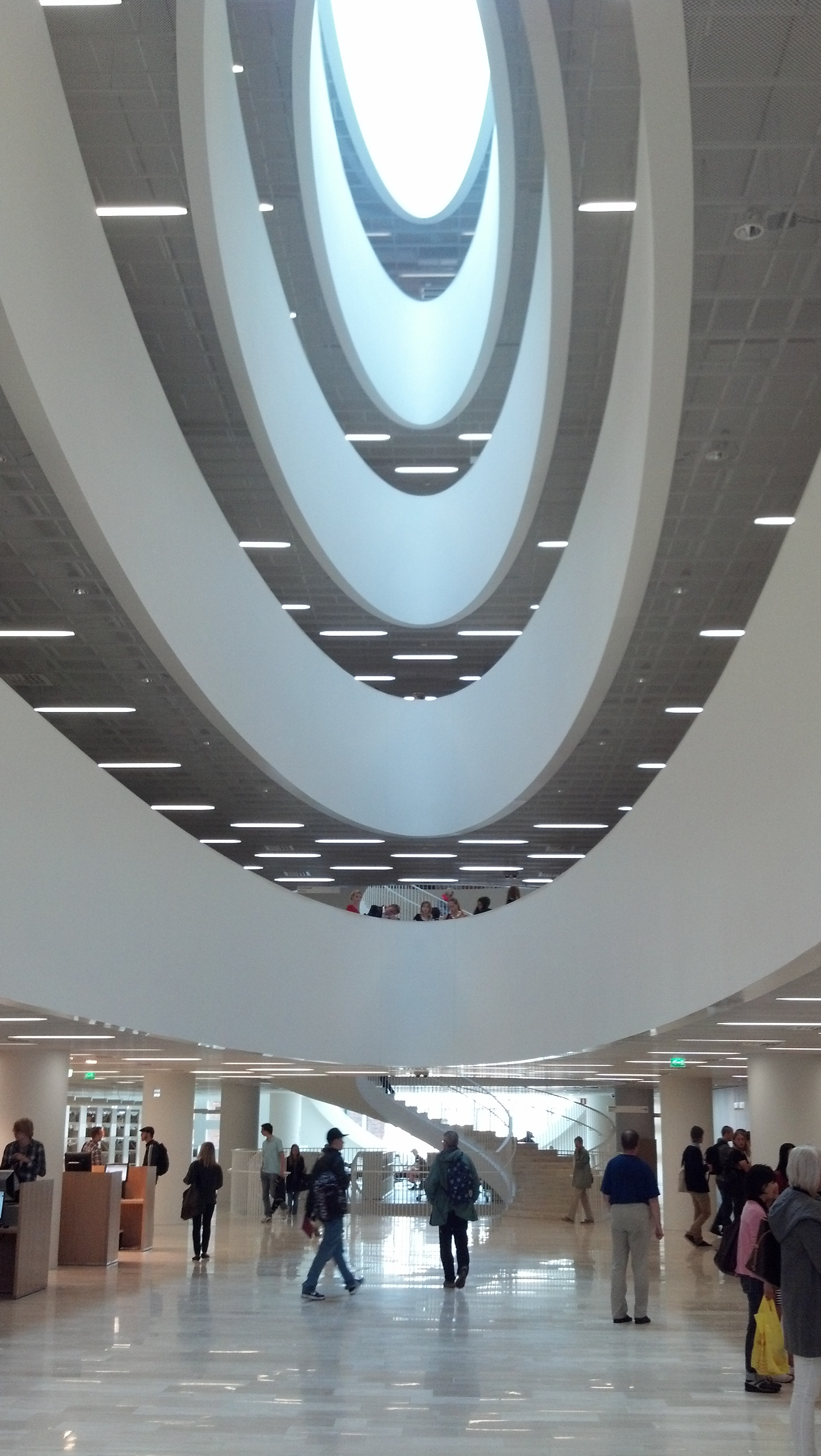
Kaisa House, University of Helsinki Library (2012), Anttinen Oiva Architects

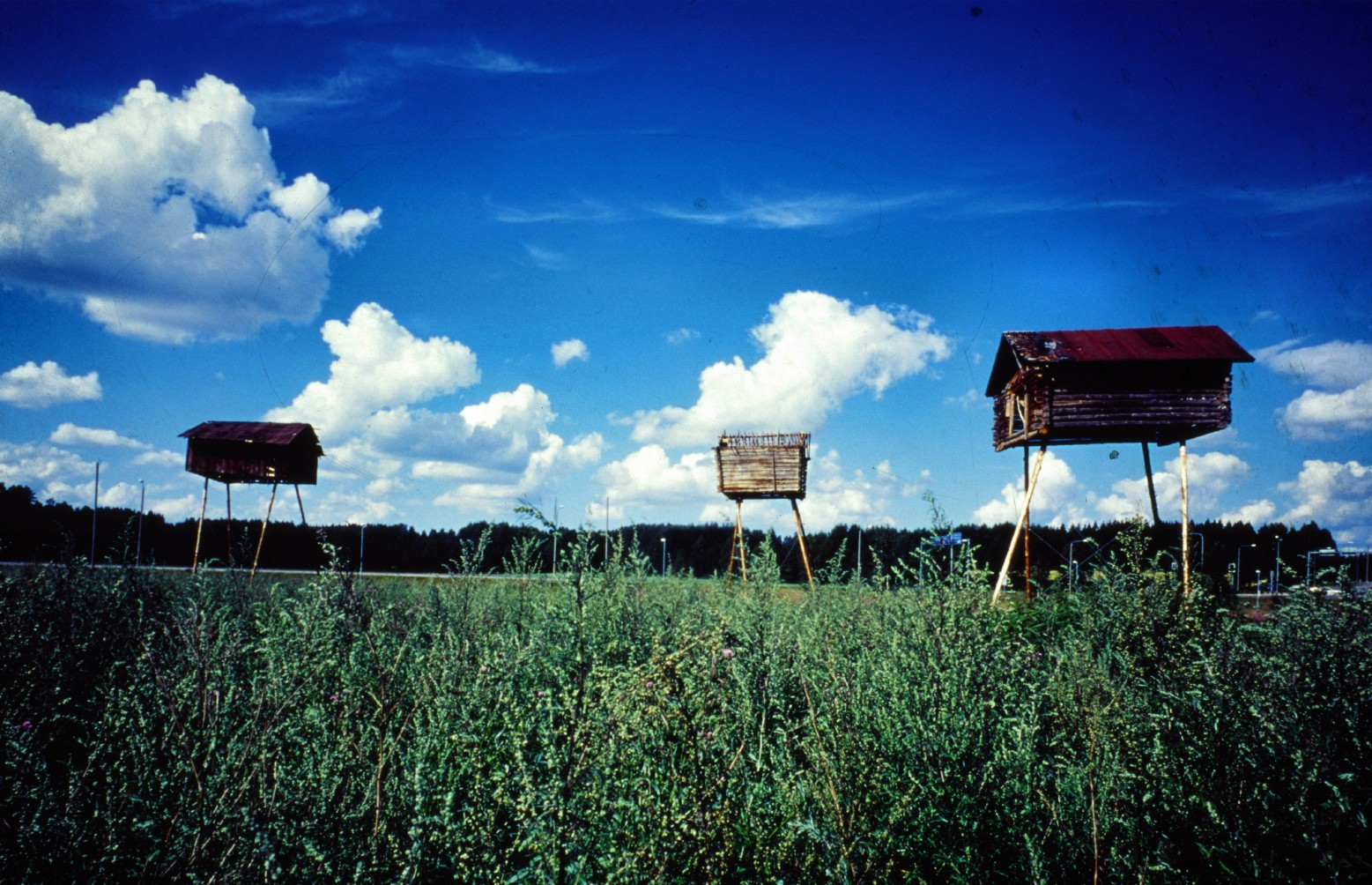
Casagrande & Rintala, "Land(e)scape" on display.

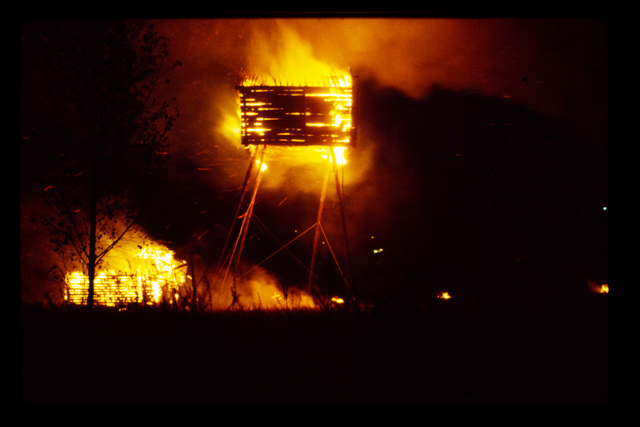
The burning of "Land(e)scape", 1999.

If Deconstructivism can be said to have had an influence on Finnish architecture in the 1990s and 2000s, it was mainly through the global influence of Dutch architect Rem Koolhaas; an architecture typified by playful formal disjunctions of forms and the use of the "generic", an anti-architecture with aesthetic value. Prime examples of this have been the work of Kai Wartiainen (e.g., High Tech Centre, Ruoholahti, Helsinki, 2001) and ARK-House Architects (e.g., Helsinki City College of Technology, Audio Visual School, 2001). Examples of more biomorphic works, if not always using parametric design principles, are seen in the work of Jyrki Tasa of Arkkitehdit NRT (e.g., Moby Dick House, Espoo, 2008; Into House, Espoo, 1998), and Anttinen Oiva Architects (Kaisa House, University of Helsinki Library, 2012). The whimsy and populism of postmodernism and its concern for playing with architecture as a form of language took a few Finnish architects into the realm of conceptual art or theoretical or "paper" architecture: for example, the works of Casagrande & Rintala were more often installations for art or architecture Biennales. Their work "Land(e)scape" (1999) involved raising old and abandoned log barns onto 10-metre high stilts – a comment on the exodus of the rural population from the Finnish rural areas – the "artwork" culminating with setting the barns on fire.

=== Neo- and generic urbanism and green building ===
Late 20th century and early 21st century Finland has witnessed greater consolidation of the greater capital region, Helsinki-Espoo-Vantaa. Helsinki, unable to expand outwards due to being hemmed in to the coastline by the neighbouring cities (formerly rural counties) of Espoo and Vantaa, has adopted planning policies of increased urban densification, also argued for under a policy of sustainable development and "green building", but also de-industrialisation, that is, moving industrial concerns away from the shorelines in proximity to the city centre, which are then redeveloped for generally up-market housing. A good example is the shoreline-facing housing development on Katajanokka, Helsinki, by Nurmela-Raimoranta-Tasa architects (2006). Significant earlier planning policies that effected urban growth were the construction of three ring roads as well as the construction of a Helsinki Metro system, begun in 1982, which in turn had been reactions to a 1968 plan by the American-Finnish firm Smith-Polivinen to drive wide freeways through the centre of Helsinki. The Metro already extends into Eastern Helsinki, and is due (2014–15) to extend into Espoo, with new growth nodes being planned around the new stations. This already occurred within the boundaries of Helsinki in the late 1970s and early 1980s, the prime example being the construction of the Itäkeskus (east centre), with the metro station integrated into a shopping centre and adjacent library and swimming hall, the most significant architectural work of the ensemble being the main shopping mall and 82-metre-tall tower (1987) by Erkki Kairamo (Gullichsen Kairamo Vormala Architects), an architect much influenced by 1920s and 30s Russian Constructivist architecture.

The former industrial, dockyard and shipbuilding areas of Helsinki are being replaced by new housing areas, designed mostly in a minimalist-functionalist style as well as new support services such as kindergartens and schools (which, for the sake of efficiency, are also intended for use as neighbourhood communal facilities; e.g. Opinmäki School and multipurpose centre [2016] by Esa Ruskeepää), as well allowing for large-scale shopping malls (e.g. the new districts of Ruoholahti, Arabianranta, Vuosaari, Hernesaari, Hanasaari, Jätkäsaari and Kalasatama), projects often driven forward by architecture and urban planning competitions. Another major landmark in urban planning and architecture was the creation, on the basis of a 1995 architectural competition, of the eco-district of Viikki (plan by Petri Laaksonen), adjacent to a new campus for the University of Helsinki. Other major cities, in particular Lahti, Tampere, Oulu and Turku are adopting similar strategies as the Greater Helsinki region, while also developing more efficient rail and road systems within these networks, while also promoting extensive bicycle path networks.

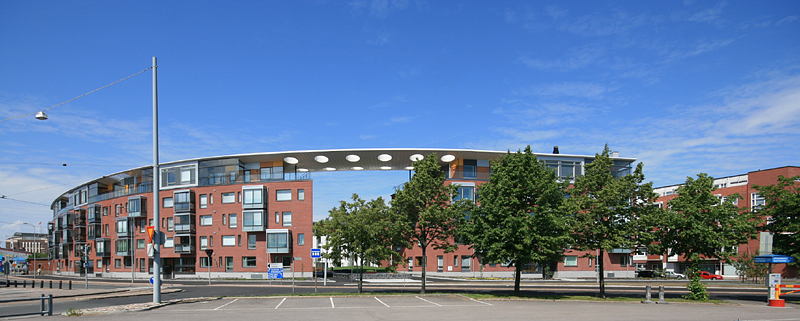
Katajanokanranta housing, Katajanokka, Helsinki, Nurmela-Raimoranta-Tasa architects (2006)

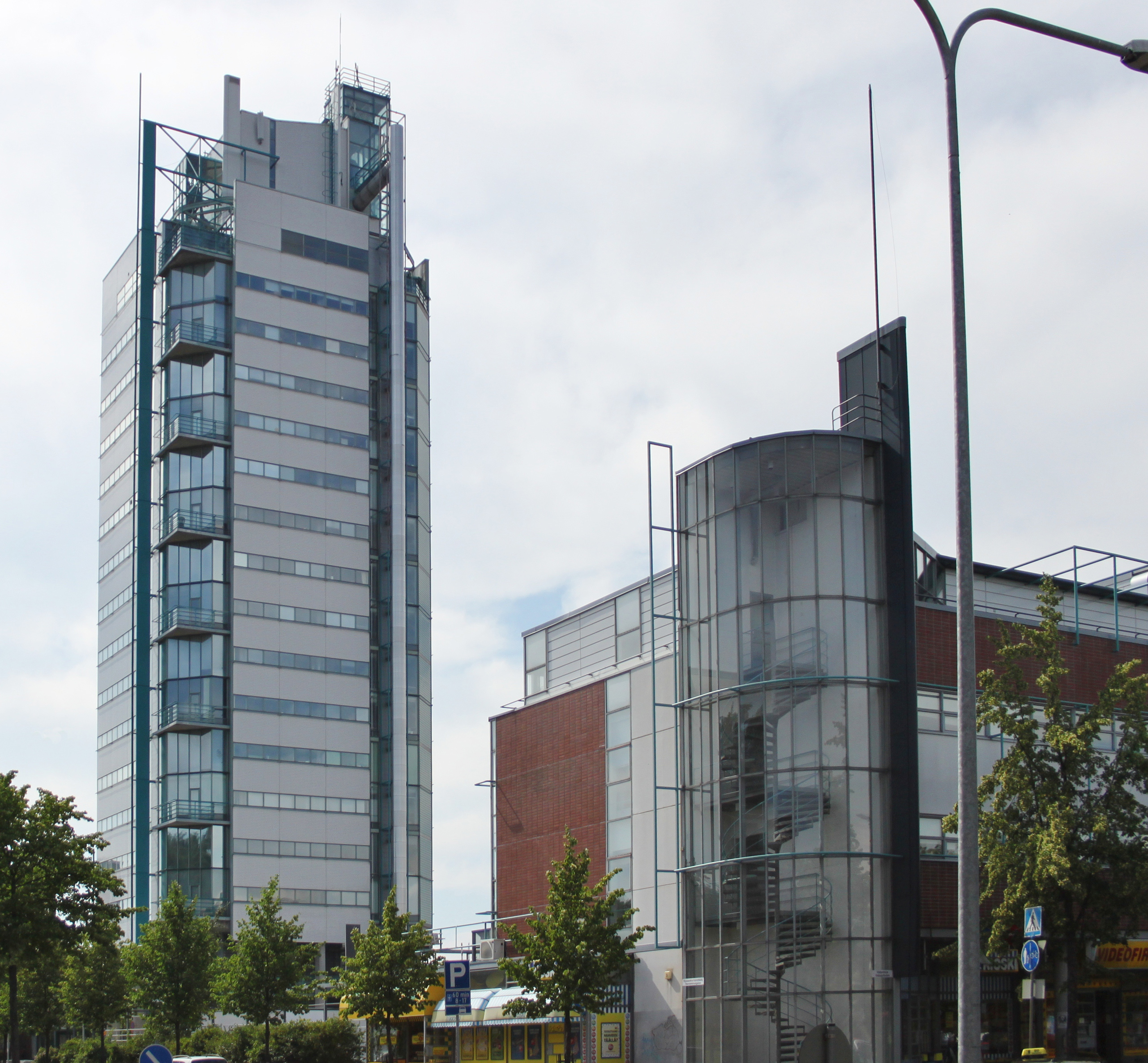
Itäkeskus (East Centre), Helsinki, Erkki Kairamo (1987).

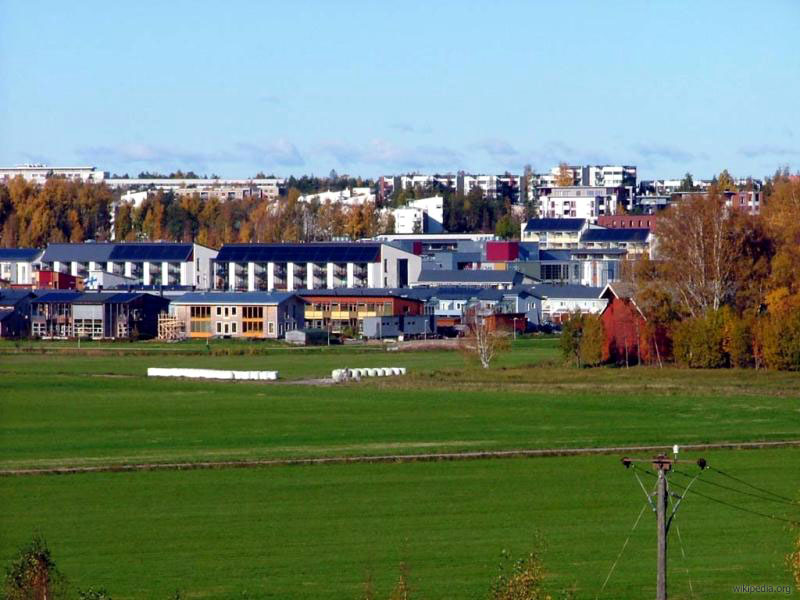
Viikki Eco Village, Helsinki, master plan by Petri Laaksonen (1995-2000).

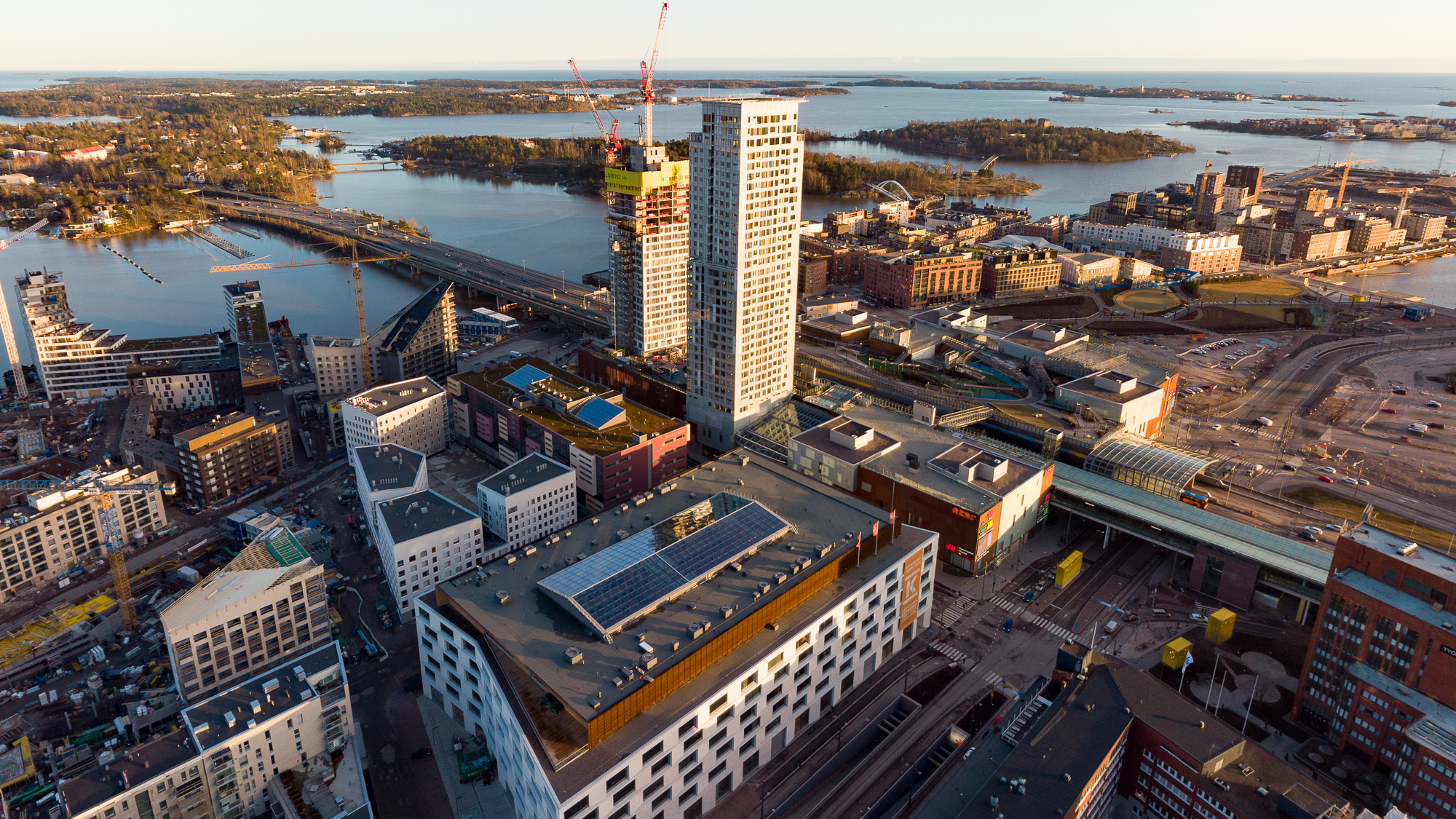
Kalasatama district, Helsinki, under construction in 2020.

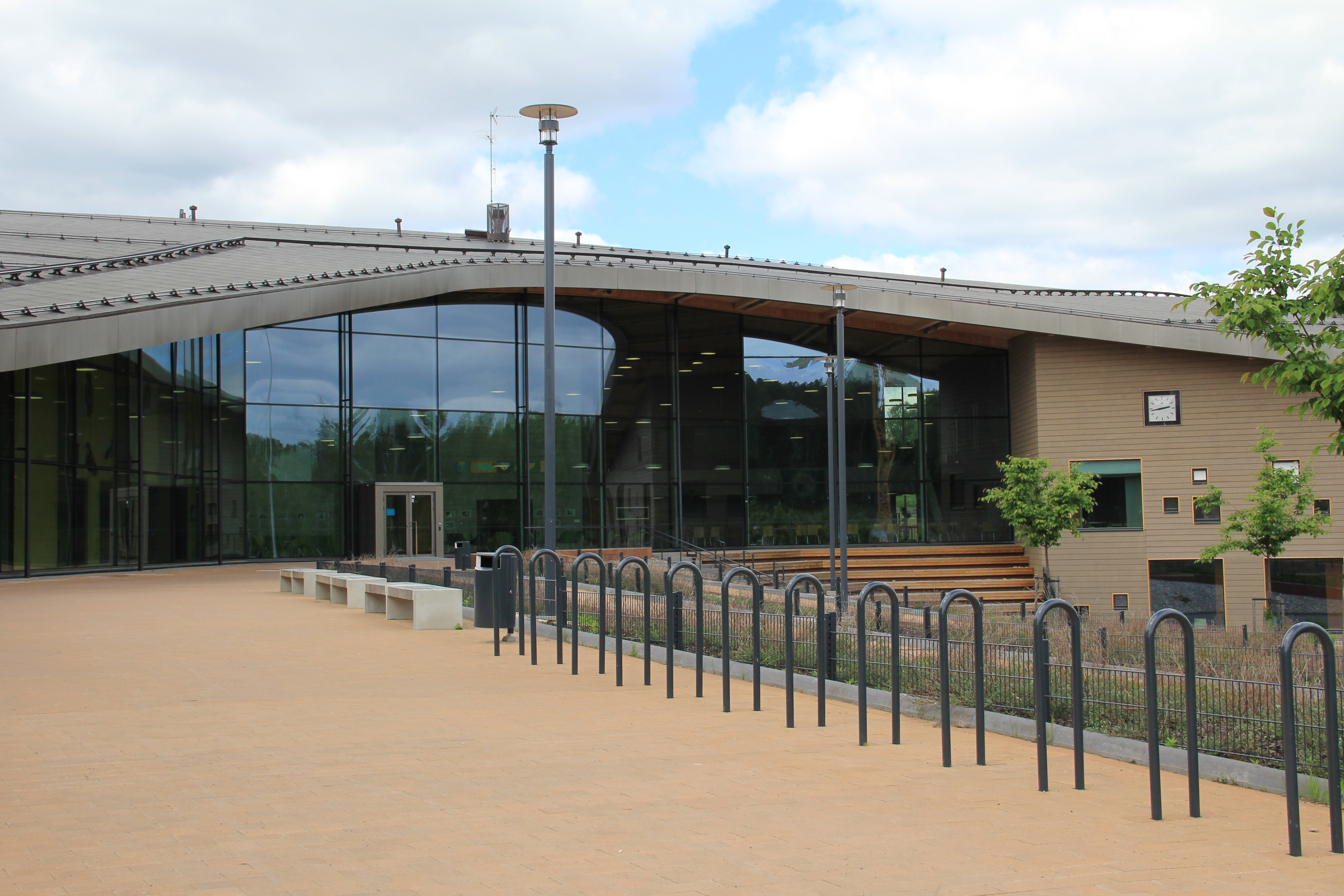
Saunalahti school and community services, Espoo, Verstas Architects (2012).

== Architecture competitions ==
Of central importance in the development of architecture in Finland for over 100 years has been the development of architectural competitions, mostly under the control of the Finnish Association of Architects (SAFA). The first architectural competition was held in 1860, even before the founding of SAFA. Twelve competitions had been held by 1880. It was only after 1893 that the competition system became more systematic, with the setting of rules. Many of the leading works of architecture at the turn of that century were the results of competitions: e.g. Tampere Cathedral (Lars Sonck, 1900), National Museum, Helsinki (Herman Gesellius, Armas Lindgren and Eliel Saarinen, 1902). Sonck was only 23 years old when he won the competition. Indeed, several well-known architects kick-started their careers while still young by winning an architecture competition. Competitions have been used not only in the design of public buildings and churches, but also for various scales of urban and regional planning. Beside Sonck and Gesellius-Lindgren-Saarinen, among the notable careers that began or were boosted by competition success are: Vyborg Library by Alvar Aalto, the Finnish pavilion at the 1958 Brussels World's Fair by Reima Pietilä, Myyrmäki Church (1984) by Juha Leiviskä, the Nokia Corporation Headquarters, Espoo (1983–97) by Helin and Siitonen Architects, the Heureka Science Centre, Vantaa (1989) by Heikkinen – Komonen Architects, the Lusto Finnish Forest Museum, Punkaharju (1994) by Lahdelma & Mahlamäki Architects, the new canopy for the Helsinki Olympic Stadium (2003) by K2S Architects, and the Kilden Performing Arts Centre (2012), Kristiansand, Norway, by ALA Architects. The competition results have been seen to have reflected the international trends of the time, or to have endorsed the critical regionalism, that is, what Aalto had referred to as "being international yet true to themselves".

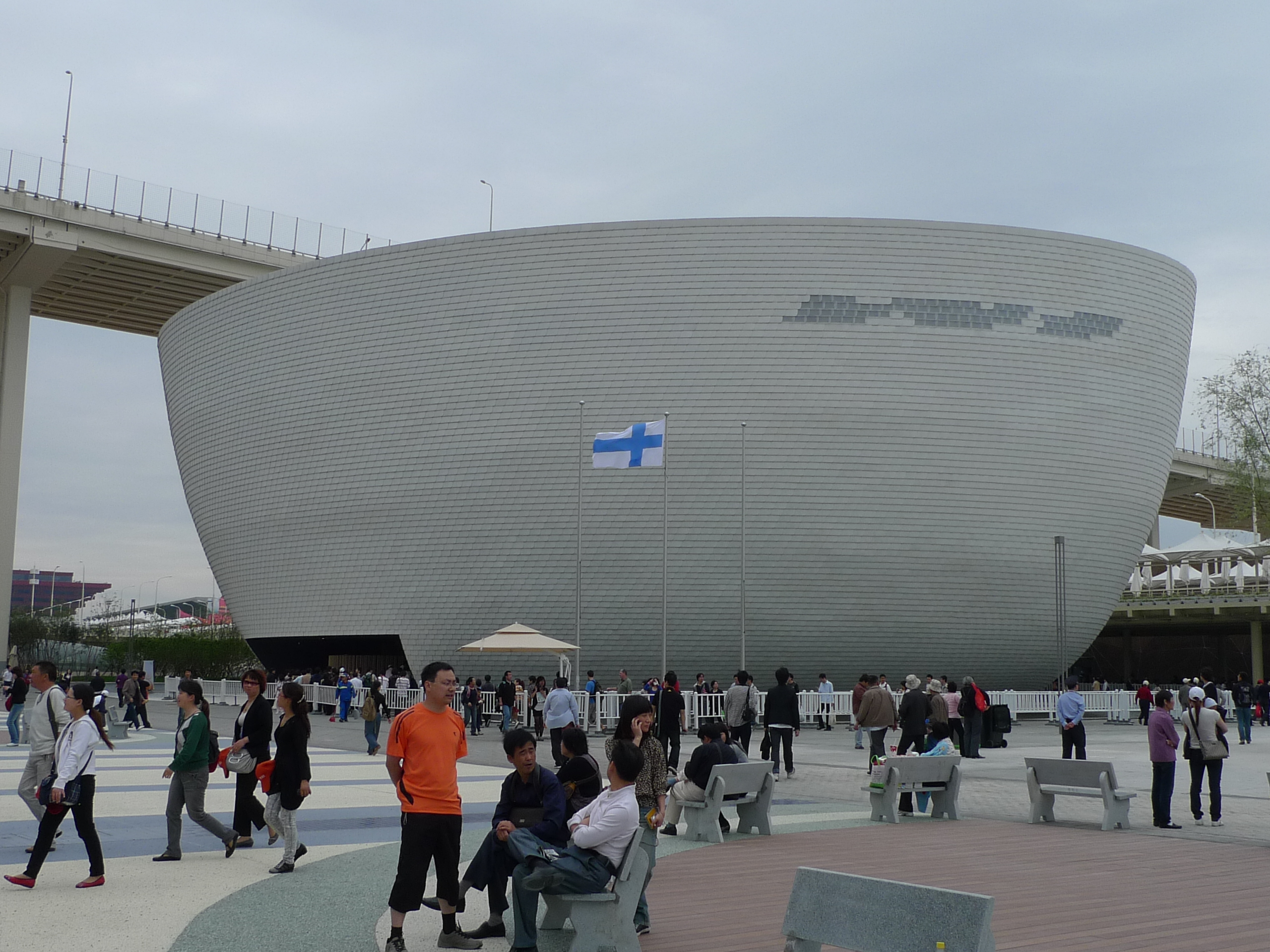
Finnish Pavilion, Shanghai Expo 2010, JKMM Architects

=== World Expo pavilion competitions ===
The individual national pavilions at the Universal Expositions, or World Expos, give each participating nation the opportunity to create a work that is supposed to make a statement or encapsulate an impression about the nation, albeit for the purpose of advertising the country for business purposes as well as cultural purposes. Finland's participation in the expositions can be viewed from economic, political and cultural-national angles; for instance, making a political statement about Finland's independence at the 1900 Paris Exposition, while still under the rule of Russia, while also making a nationalistic statement about Finland. In terms of architecture, competitions between Finnish architects have been of great importance in making such statements. Finland has attended the majority of World Fairs since 1851, The Great Exhibition in London, albeit on that occasion as part of the Russian pavilion. Finland has had ten pavilions of its own, eight of which were chosen on the basis of an architectural competition: Paris, France, 1889 (pavilion by French architect), Paris, France, 1900 (pavilion by Gesellius-Lindgren-Saarinen after a competition), Antwerp, Belgium, 1930 (pavilion by Erik Bryggman after a competition), Brussels, Belgium, 1935 (pavilion by Aarne Hytönen and Risto-Veikko Luukkonen, without a competition), Paris, France, 1937 (pavilion by Alvar Aalto after a competition), New York, USA, 1939 ("interior pavilion" by Alvar Aalto after a competition), Brussels, Belgium, 1958 (pavilion by Reima Pietilä after a competition), Seville, Spain, 1992 (pavilion by Monark after a competition), Hannover, Germany, 2000 (pavilion by Sarlotta Narjus and Antti-Matti Siikala after a competition), Shanghai, China, 2010 (pavilion by JKMM Architects after a competition). The exhibition pavilions were all demolished after the close of the exposition, with the exception of the Finnish pavilion at Seville Expo '92 in Spain; afterwards, the building was remodelled to house the headquarters of Fundación FIDAS, the Association of Architects of Seville.

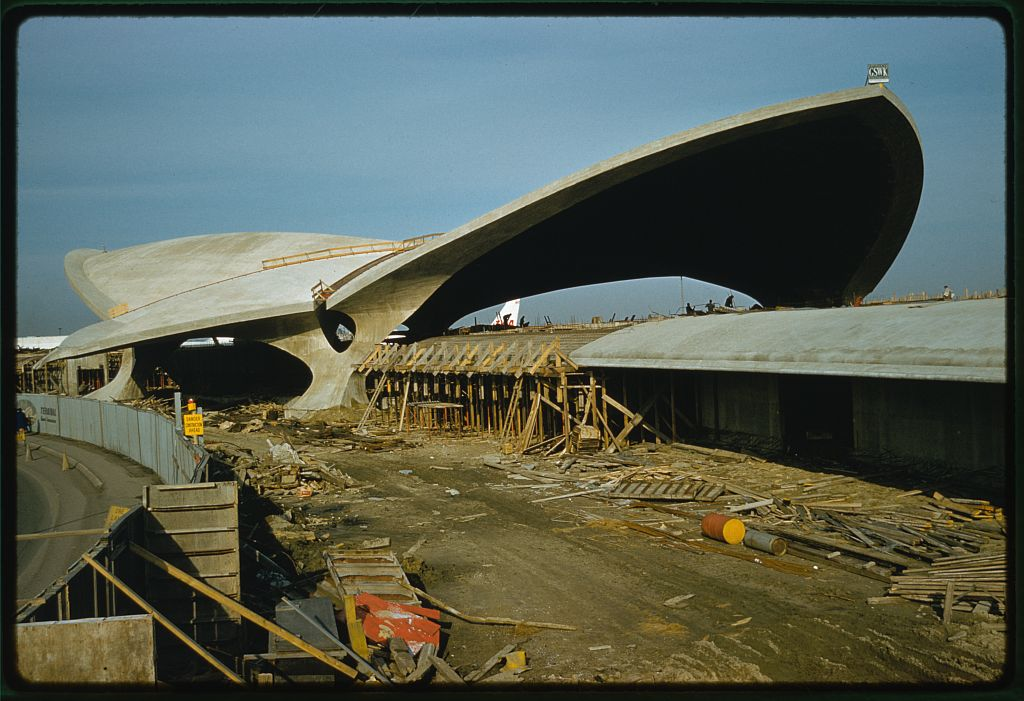
TWA Terminal, New York, Eero Saarinen (1956-62) under construction.

== Influences abroad ==
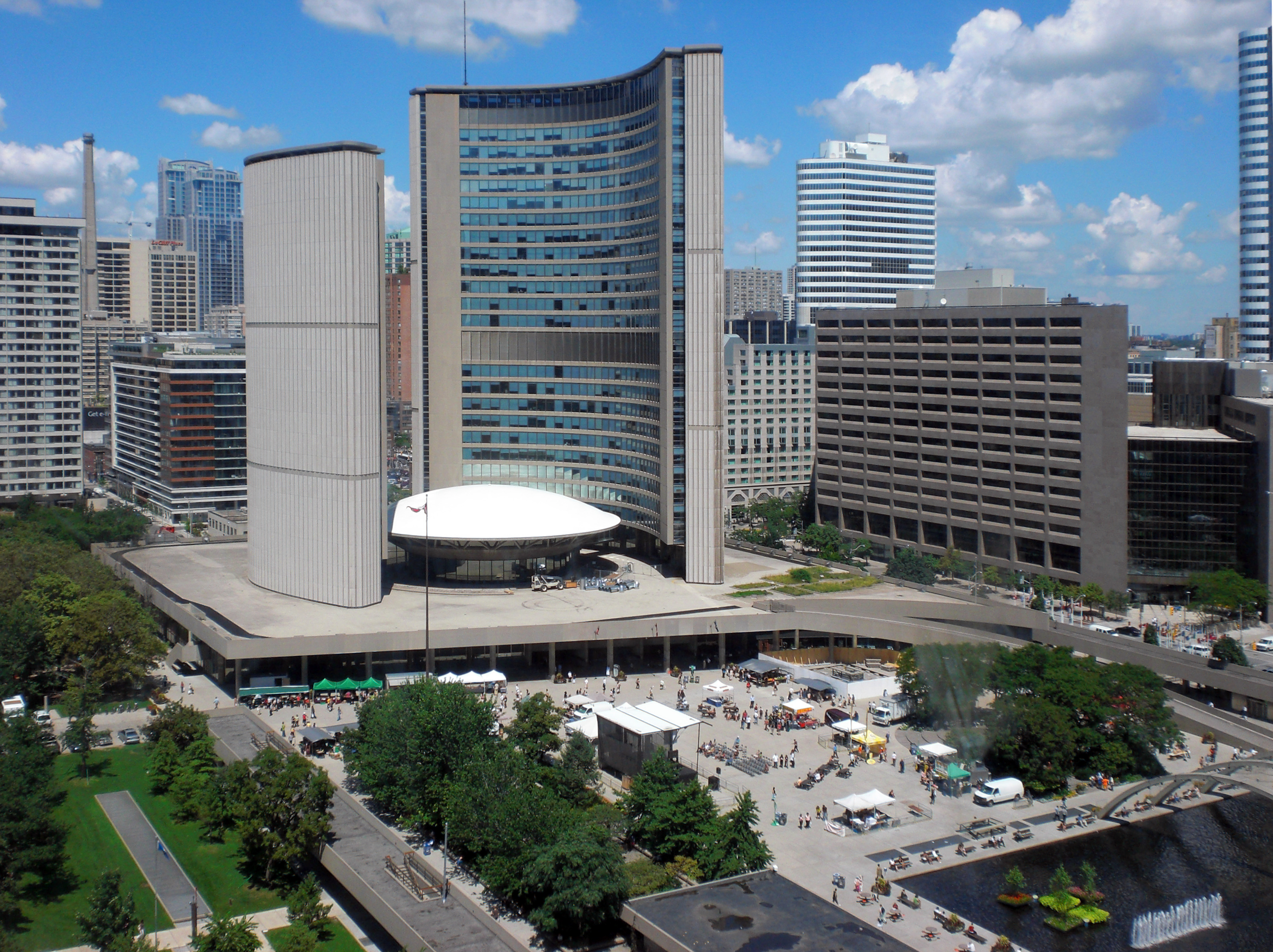
New City Hall of Toronto (1966) designed by Viljo Revell.

Finnish architects, primarily Alvar Aalto, have had a significant influence outside Finland. In a jointly penned article in 1965, renowned American architecture historians Henry-Russell Hitchcock and G. E. Kidder Smith summed up the influence of Finnish architects on the US as follows: "Considering that the population of Finland is roughly half that of greater New York, the extent and the degree to which Finnish architecture has impinged upon the outside world - particularly upon the United States - in the last 40 years is quite extraordinary."

More recently, distinguished Portuguese architect Álvaro Siza Vieira, British architect Colin St John Wilson and American architects Richard Meier, Robert Venturi and Steven Holl have each expressed the influence of Aalto on their work. Indeed, Holl has had the opportunity on two occasions to build next to Aalto buildings, with his competition-winning entry for the Helsinki Museum of Contemporary Art, named after his entry titled Kiasma (1993–98), built close to Aalto's Finlandia Hall, and Simmons Hall at MIT (2002) in Cambridge, USA, built opposite Aalto's Baker House (1947–49). But before Aalto, the first significant event in direct influence was Eliel Saarinen emigrating to the United States in 1923 - after having received second prize in the Chicago Tribune Tower competition of 1922 - where he was responsible for the design of the campus for the Cranbrook Academy of Art, Michigan. Often dubbed as the "Architect of the American Century", Eero Saarinen (1910–61), although born in Finland, the son of Eliel Saarinen, was raised and educated mostly in the United States, and created significant pieces of architecture throughout the United States, from the TWA Flight Center at New York's Kennedy Airport to the Gateway Arch over St. Louis - the style of each building varying considerably depending on the context and design brief. With his popularity, Saarinen was able to influence the choice of architecture in line with his own, as he did in the selection of Jorn Utzon's entry for the competition for the Sydney Opera House, Australia, as well as in the selection of Finnish architect Viljo Revell's entry for the competition for Toronto City Hall, Canada (1958–65). Another Finnish architect to find creative success after emigrating was Cyril Mardall (born Cyril Sjöström, son of notable architect Einar Sjöström); he moved to England in 1927 with his British mother following his father's death, and in 1944 went into partnership with F. R. S. Yorke and Czech emigre Eugene Rosenberg to form the architectural firm Yorke Rosenberg Mardall, better known as YRM. A specialist in prefabricated timber houses, learnt from Finland, among Mardall's notable works are housing for Stevenage and Harlow new towns, as well as the Finnish Lutheran Missionary Church in London (1958).

In more recent times, as actual buildings designed by Finnish architects has been the architectural theory - and prolific amount of writing published in several different languages - by Finnish architect and theorist Juhani Pallasmaa, with such books as The Eyes of the Skin – Architecture and the Senses (2012), Understanding Architecture (2012) and The Thinking Hand (2009), and Finnish architecture theorist Kari Jormakka, with such books as Eyes That Do Not See (2012), Heimlich Manoevres - Ritual in Architecture (1995) and Basic Design Methods (2007).

== Foreign architects in Finland ==
The first prominent architects in Finland came from abroad, most notably Carlo Bassi from Italy and Carl Ludvig Engel from Prussia in the 19th century, designing in the neoclassical style. But since then there have been relatively few "foreign" architects working in Finland or even of cases of individual buildings designed by foreign architects. Also having a major influence in the mid-to-late 19th century was the Swedish-born Georg Theodor Chiewitz, who designed in both the Neo-Renaissance and Neo-Gothic styles. There are known early cases of the Finnish state inviting foreign architects to offer their expertise on a technical planning issue, as with the invitation to the German hospital architects Carl Schleicher and Schüll Düren in the 1910s to make a proposal for the Women's Clinic in Helsinki, their project designed very much in the classical style of the time. A unique example of a commission from a foreign architect from the pre-independence era is that of a private house in Kruununhaka in Helsinki designed by Scottish architect Robert Lorimer, completed in 1901 for an industrialist and his Scottish wife; the redbrick building designed in a typical English-Scottish style of the time later became the British Embassy before being sold to a private club, Svenska Klubben.

Beginning already in the late 1920s, tens of foreign architects were enticed to seek work in the office of Alvar Aalto, albeit for short durations, most notably the Danish architect Jørn Utzon, British architect Patrick Hodgkinson and Swiss architect Bruno Erat. Erat in particular settled in Finland and became renowned as a pioneer of ecological houses, especially in the use passive solar heating and in 1978 built the first low energy building in Finland.

With foreign architects being allowed to enter Finnish architecture competitions, a significant number have been won by architects from different countries. American architect Steven Holl became the first foreign architect to win the commission for a major public building in Finland, following a competition, with the design of the Kiasma Museum of Contemporary Art (1993-1998) in Helsinki. Holl then won a second architectural competition in 2006 for a luxury housing development in the Taka-Töölö district of Helsinki; his proposal, called Meander, was not completed until 2025. The Swedish architect Erika Wörman of Djurgårdsstaden Arkitekter won the 1988 competition for the design of the extensive Kartanonkoski housing area in Vantaa, with a colourful postmodernist design that was radically different from Finnish housing schemes of the time. The Gösta Serlachius Museum (2014) in Mänttä was designed by the Barcelona architects studio MX_SI. The competition for the Helsinki Guggenheim Museum (2015) was won by French-Japanese architect partnership Moreau Kusunoki Architectes. The Danish architects Schauman Nordgren Architects won three major architecture-town planning competitions within a three-month period in 2016-17 for sites in Pargas, Tampere, and Jyväskylä.

Direct commissions from foreigners are rare, especially of so-called star architects; the British-Swedish architect Ralph Erskine designed a significant public housing area in Malminkartano in 1978–81, though only mimicking the user-participation method he had used elsewhere. The American architect Daniel Libeskind was commissioned to design the Tampere Nokia Arena (2021). There have also been notable architect partnerships between Finns and foreigners, most notably the UK-based Finn Cyril Mardall of Yorke Rosenberg Mardall, better known as YRM. More recent notable partnerships are Finnish architect Niklas Sandås with Austrian architect Claudia Auer (e.g. Tuomarila daycare centre, Espoo, 2008), Finnish architect Hennu Kjisik with British architect Trevor Harris (e.g. Jyväskylä travel centre, 2004), and Finnish architect Tiina Parkkinen with Austrian architect Alfred Berger (e.g. Nordic embassy compound, Berlin, 1999).

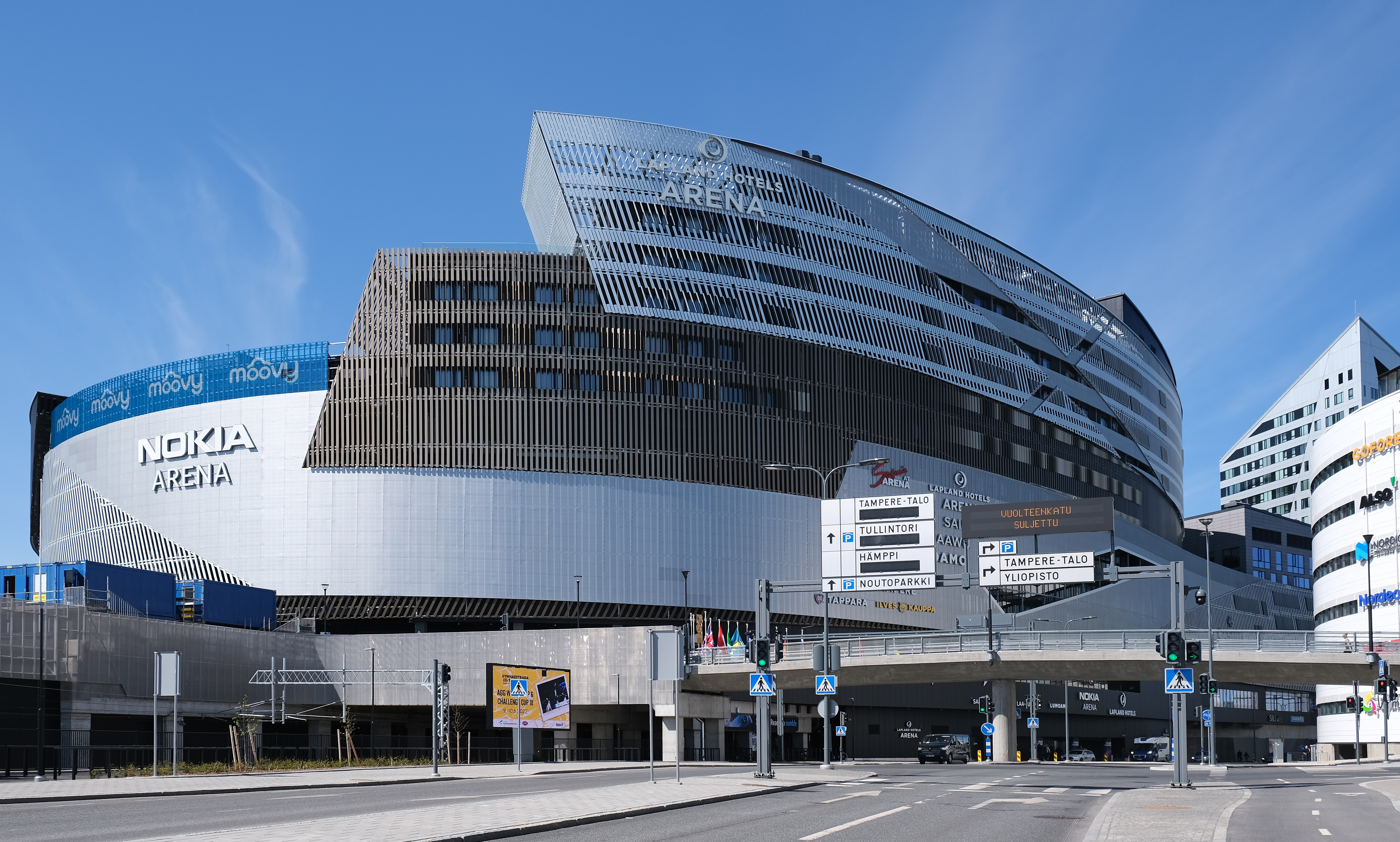
Nokia Arena, Tampere, by American architect Daniel Libeskind (2021)

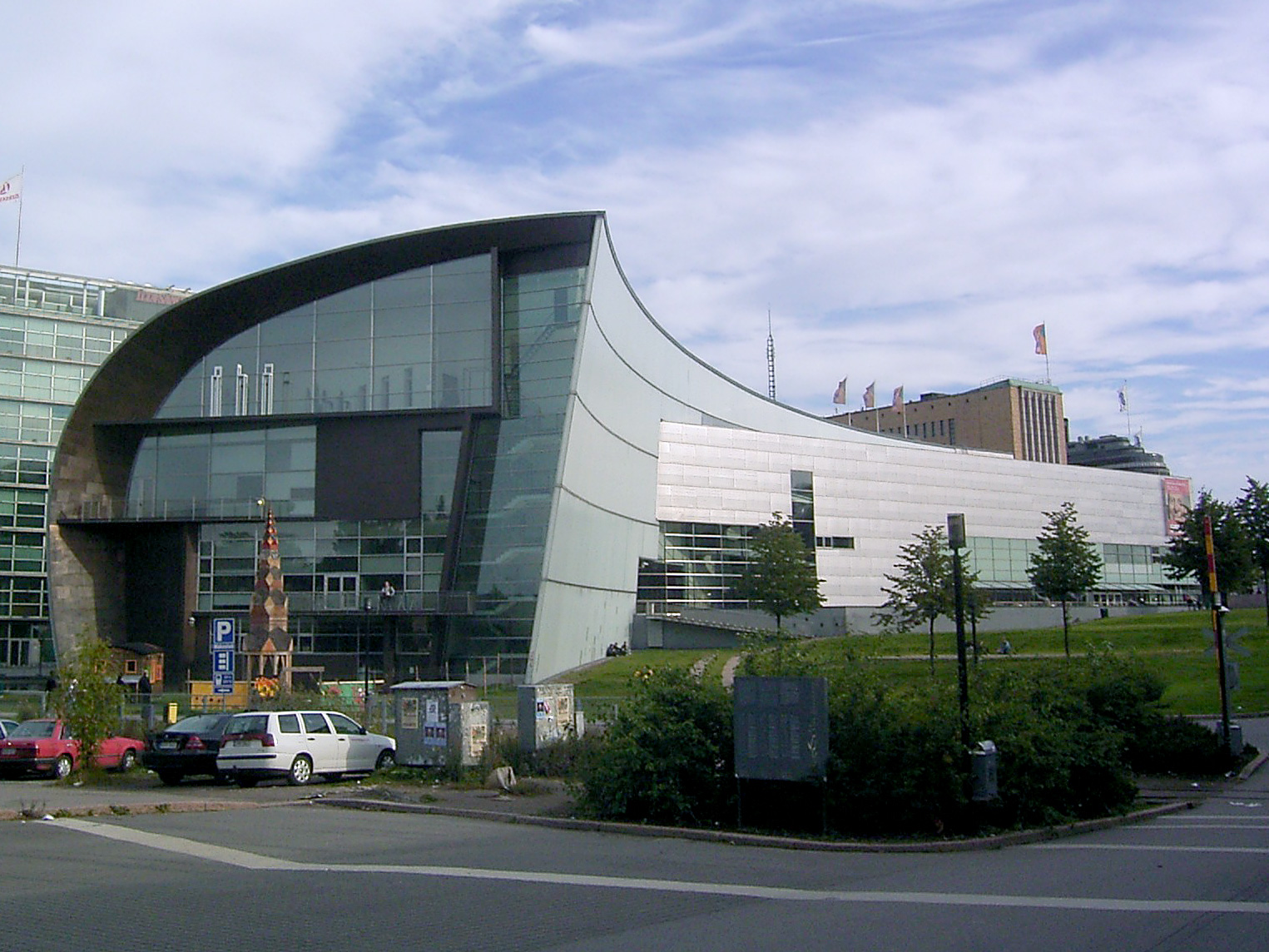
Kiasma Museum of Contemporary Art, Helsinki, by American architect Steven Holl (1998)

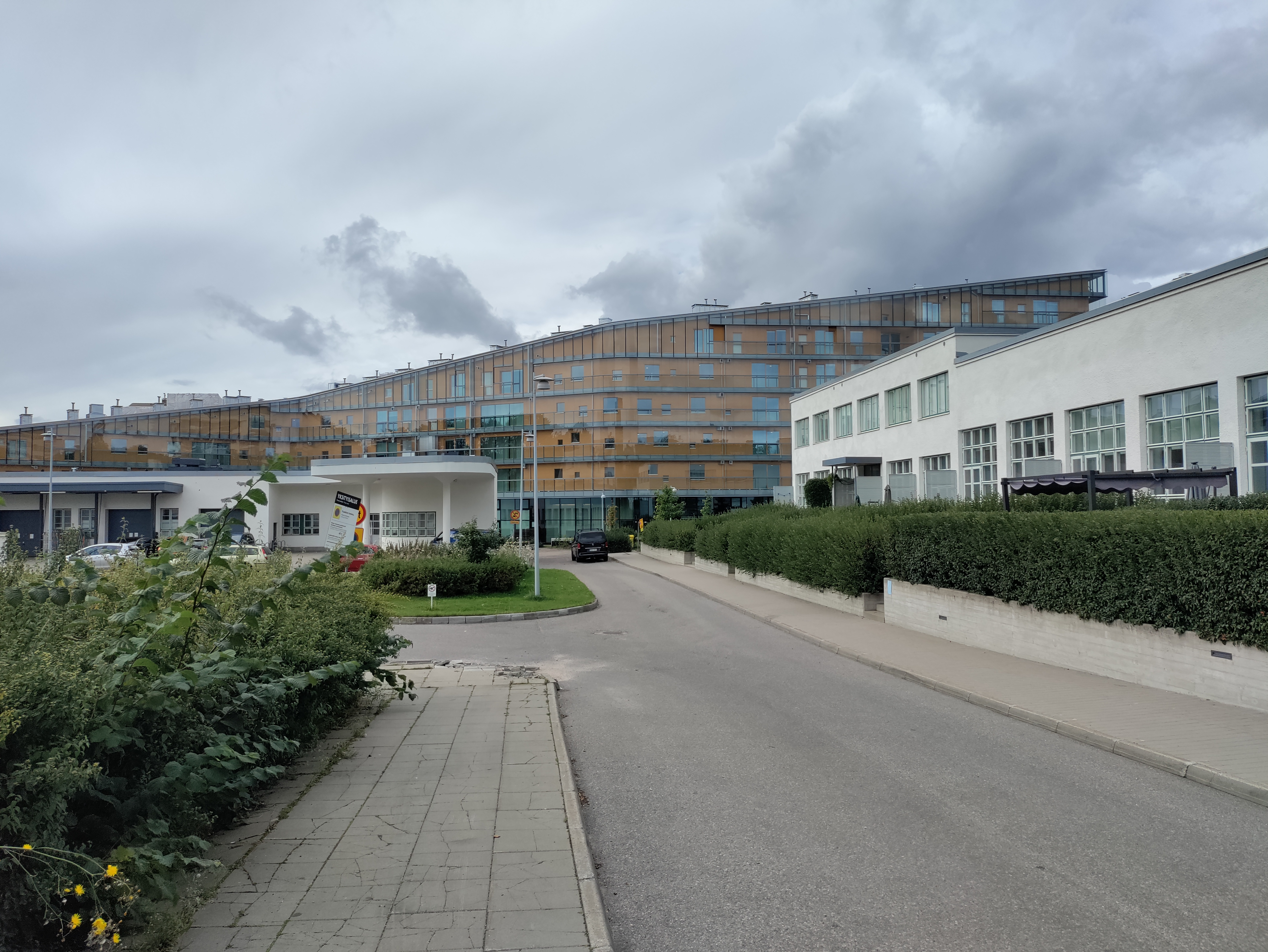
Meander housing complex, Helsinki, by Steven Holl (2025)

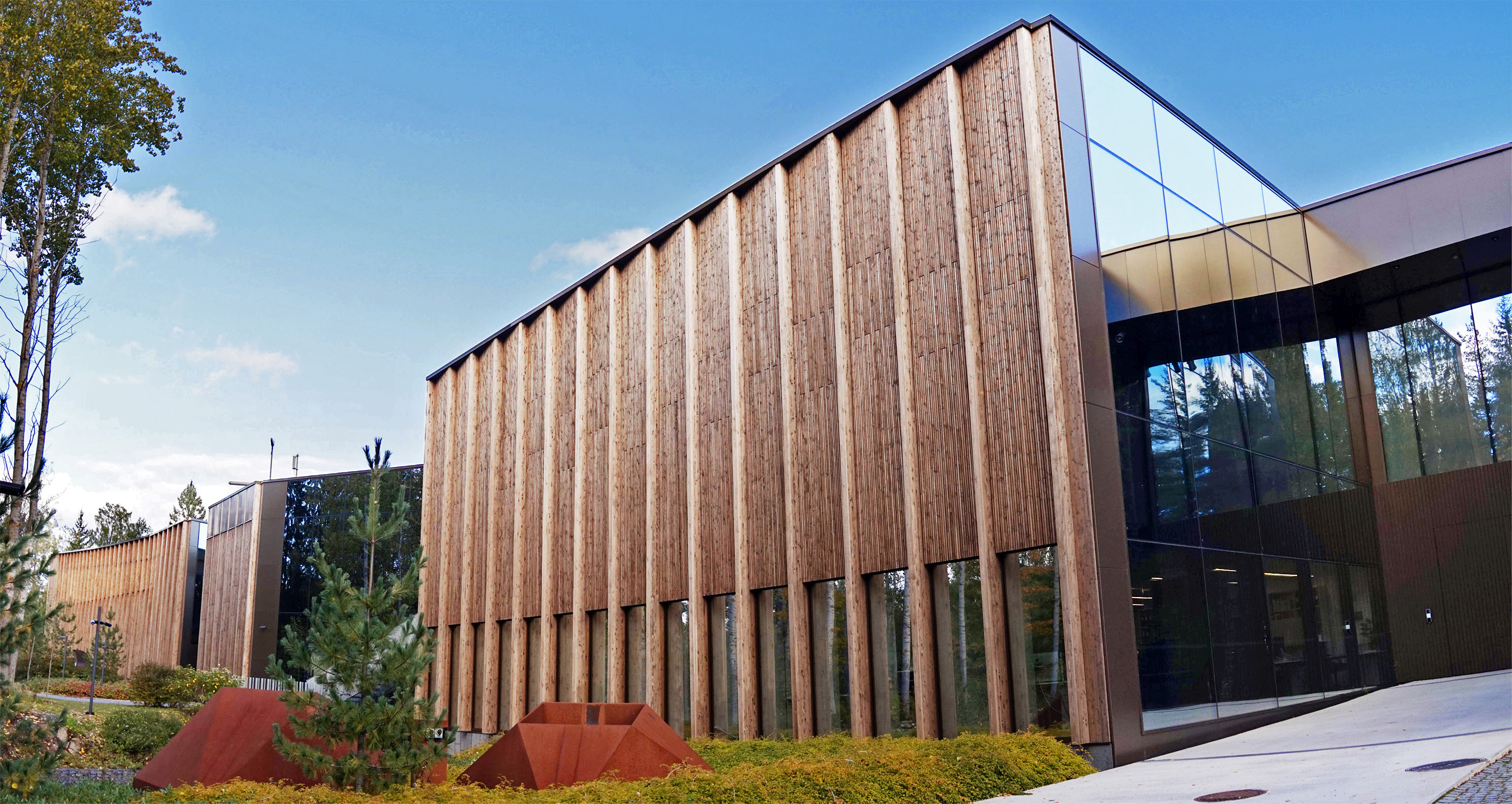
Gösta Serlachius Museum, Mänttä, by Barcelona architects studio MX_SI (2014)

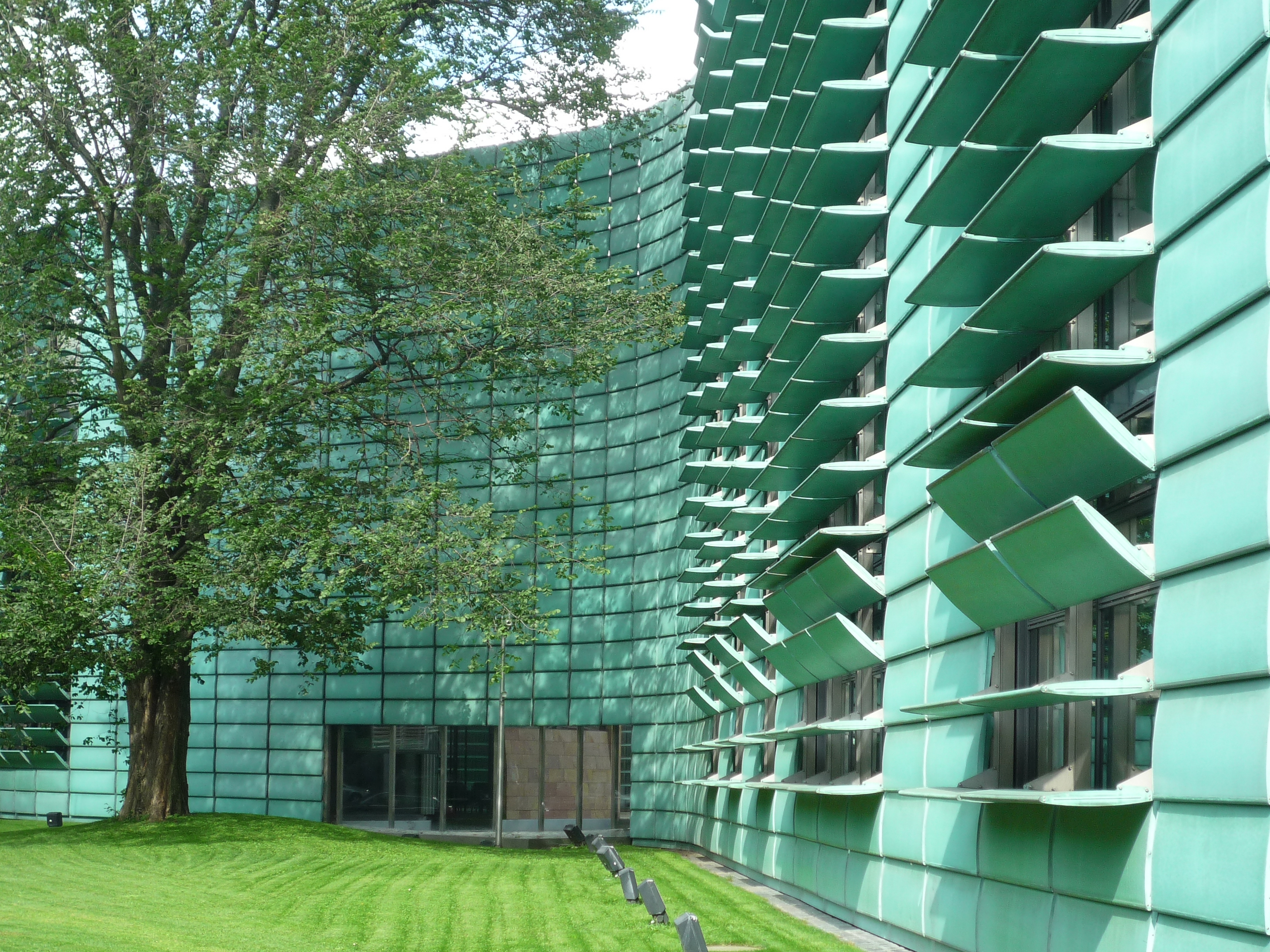
Nordic Embassy compound, Berlin, by Finnish-Austrian architects Architekten Berger + Parkkinen (1999)

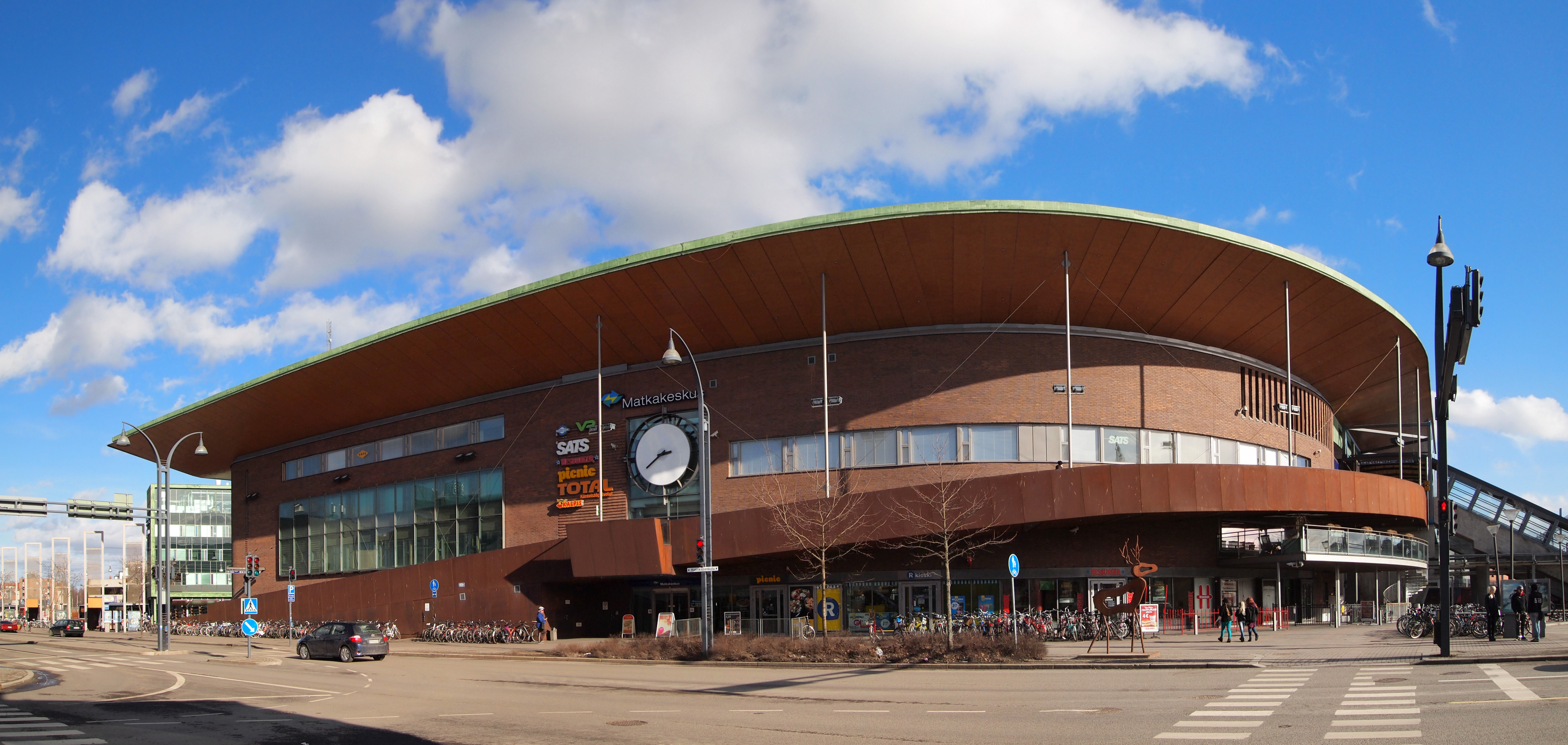
Jyväskylä travel centre by Finnish-British architecture partnership Harris - Kjisik Architects (2004)

== See also ==
- Culture of Finland
- Art of Finland
- List of Finnish architects
- List of World Heritage Sites in Finland
- List of medieval stone churches in Finland
